This is a list of state leaders in the 18th century (1701–1800) AD, except for the leaders within the Holy Roman Empire, and the leaders within British south Asia and its predecessor states.

These polities are generally sovereign states, but excludes minor dependent territories, whose leaders can be found listed under territorial governors in the 18th century. For completeness, these lists can include colonies, protectorates, or other dependent territories that have since gained sovereignty.

Africa

Central

Angola

Kasanje Kingdom (complete list) –
Kiluanje kya Ngonga, King (c.1690s–1700s)
Kinguri kya Kasombe, King (c.1700s)
Kitumba kya Kalunga, King (c.1710s)
Kambamba ka Kinguri, King (c.1720s)
Kasanje ka Kiluanje, King (c.1730s)
Lubame lwa Kipungo, King (c.1739–1750s)
Ngunza a Kambamba, King (c.1750–1770)
Lukala lwa Njinje, King (early 1770s)
Kalunga ka Luhame, King (mid 1770s)
Kitumba kya Wanga, King (late 1770s–early 1780s)
Kisweya kya Kambamba, King (1780s)
Kitamba kya Shiba, King (c.1785–1792)
Malenge a Ngonga, King (1792–c.1810)
Kingdom of Kongo (complete list) –
João II of Lemba, Awenekongo, Lemba claimant (1680–1716)
Manuel of Lovata, Awenekongo, Mbamba Lovata claimant (1678–1715)
Pedro IV, Awenekongo, Kibangu claimant (1695–1709), Manikongo (1709–1718)
Manuel II, Manikongo (1718–1743)
Garcia IV, Manikongo (1743–1752)
Manuel II, Manikongo (1752–post-1758)
Nicolau I, Manikongo (mid-18th century)
Afonso IV, Manikongo (mid-18th century)
António II, Manikongo (mid-18th century)
Sebastião I, Manikongo (?–1763)
Pedro V, Manikongo (1763–1764)
Álvaro XI, Manikongo (1764–1778)
José I, Manikongo (1778–1785)
Afonso V, Manikongo (1785–1787)
Álvaro XII, Manikongo (1787–?)
Alexio I, Manikongo (?–1793)
Joaquim I, Manikongo (1793–1794)
Henrique II, Manikongo (1794–1803)
Kingdom of Matamba (complete list) –
Verónica I, Queen (1681–1721)
Afonso I, King (1721–1741)
Ana II, Queen (1741–1756)
Verónica II, Queen (1756–1758)
Ana III, Queen (1758–?)
Francisco II, King (late 18th century)
Portuguese Angola (complete list) –
Colony, 1575–1951
For details see the Kingdom of Portugal under Southwest Europe

Cameroon

Fondom of Bafut (complete list) –
Chunga, King (1677–1708)
Ngwa Abi-Fu, King (1708–1752)
Tumfong, King (1752–1799)
Achirimbi I , King (1799–1852)
Kingdom of Bamum (complete list) –
Koutou, Mfon (1672–1757)
Mbouombouo, Mfon (1757–1814)
Duala people (complete list) –
Mapoka a Ngie, ruler (17th–18th century)
Kuo a Mapoka, ruler (18th century)
George, Senior chief, King (fl.1788–90)
Priso a Doo, Chief (late 18th century)
Kwane a Ngie, Chief (late 18th century)
Kwa a Kuo, ruler (18th–early 19th century)

Central African Republic

Chad

Sultanate of Bagirmi (complete list) –
‘Abdul Qadir I, Mbangi (1680–1707)
Bar, Mbangi (1707–1722)
Wanja, Mbangi (1722–1736)
Burkomanda II Tad Lele, Mbangi (1736–1741)
Loel, Mbangi (1741–1751)
Hajji Mohammed al'Amin, Mbangi (1751–1785)
‘Abd ar-Rahman Gawrang, Mbangi (1785–1806)
Wadai Empire (complete list) –
Muhammad Salih Derret ibn Jawda, Kolak (1795–1803)

Congo, Democratic Republic of the

Kuba Kingdom (complete list) –
KotomBoke, Nyim (17th or 18th century)
Golo Shanga, Nyim (18th century)
Misha Mishanga Shanga, Nyim (18th century)
Bokare Che, Nyim (18th century)
Bushabun Che, Nyim (18th century)
Koto Che, Nyim (18th century)
Misha Pelenge Che, Nyim (18th century)
Bope Pelenge, Nyim (18th century)
Kata Mbula, Nyim (1776–1810)
Kingdom of Luba (complete list) –
Nkongolo Mwamba, muLopwe (?–1780)
Ilunga Sungu, muLopwe (1780–1809)
Lunda Empire (complete list) –
Mbala I Yaav, Mwaant Yaav (c.1690–c.1720)
Mukaz Munying Kabalond, Mwaant Yaav (c.1720)
Muteba I Kat Kateng, Mwaant Yaav (c.1720–c.1750)
Mukaz Waranankong, Mwaant Yaav (c.1750–c.1767)
Nawej Mufa Muchimbunj, Mwaant Yaav (c.1767–c.1775)
Cikombe Yaava, Mwaant Yaav (c.1775–c.1800)

Congo, Republic of the

Kingdom of Loango (complete list) –
N'Gangue M'voumbe Nombo, King (?–1766)
N'Gangue M'voumbe Makosso, King (1773–1787)

Equatorial Guinea

Spanish Guinea (complete list) –
Colony, 1778–1968
For details see Spain in southwest Europe

Gabon

Kingdom of Orungu (complete list) –
Reto Ndongo, Founder (c.1700–?)
Ndébulia Mburu, Agamwinboni (c.1730–?)
Rénjangué Ndongo, Agamwinboni (?–1750)
Rénkondjé, Agamwinboni (c.1750)
Ngwèrangu'Iwono, Agamwinboni (c.1750–1790)
Ndombe, Agamwinboni (1790)
Rénwombi "Mpolo", Agamwinboni (1790–1810)

São Tomé and Príncipe

Portuguese São Tomé and Príncipe (complete list) –
Colony, 1470–1951
For details see the Kingdom of Portugal under Southwest Europe

East

Great Lakes area

Burundi

Kingdom of Burundi (complete list) –
Ntare I, King (c.1680–c.1709)
Mwezi III, King (c.1709–c.1739)
Mutaga III, King (c.1739–c.1767)
Mwambutsa I, King (c.1767–c.1796)
Ntare IV, King (c.1796–c.1850)

Kenya

Sultanate of Mombasa (complete list) –
‘Ali ibn Uthman al-Mazru‘i, Sultan (1746–1755)
Masud ibn Naisr al-Mazru‘i, Sultan (1755–1773)
Abdallah ibn Muhammad al-Mazru‘i, Sultan (1773–1782)
Ahmad ibn Muhammad al-Mazru‘i, Sultan (1782–1811)
Pate Sultanate: Nabahani dynasty (complete list) –
Bwana Mkuu, Mfalume (1688–1713)
Bwana Tamu, Mfalume (1713–?)
Fumo Madi ibn Abi Bakr, Mfalume (1779–1809)

Rwanda

Kingdom of Rwanda (complete list) – 
Cyilima II Rujugira, King (1675–1708)
Kigeli III Ndabarasa, King (1708–1741)
Mibambwe III Mutabazi II Sentabyo, King (1741–1746)
Yuhi IV Gahindiro, King (1746–1802)

South Sudan

Shilluk Kingdom –
Tugø, Rädh (c.1690–1710)
Nyokwejø, Rädh (c.1780–1820)

Tanzania

Uganda

Ankole (complete list) –
Macwa, Omugabe (c.1727–c.1755)
Rwabirere, Omugabe (c.1755–1783)
Kahaya I, Omugabe (1783–?)
Buganda (complete list) –
Kayemba, Kabaka (c.1690–c.1704)
Tebandeke, Kabaka (c.1704–c.1724)
Ndawula, Kabaka (c.1724–c.1734)
Kagulu, Kabaka (c.1734–c.1736)
Kikulwe, Kabaka (c.1736–c.1738)
Mawanda. (c.1738–c.1740)
Mwanga I, Kabaka (c.1740–c.1741)
Namuggala, Kabaka (c.1741–c.1750)
Kyabaggu, Kabaka (c.1750–c.1780)
Jjunju, Kabaka (c.1780–c.1797)
Semakookiro, Kabaka (c.1797–c.1814)
Bunyoro (complete list) –
Kyebambe II, Omukama 
Olimi III, Omukama (c.1710–1731)
Duhaga, Omukama (1731–c.1782)
Olimi IV, Omukama (c.1782–1786)
Nyamutukura Kyebambe III, Omukama (1786–1835)

Horn of Africa area

Djibouti

Eritrea

Ethiopia

Ethiopian Empire (complete list) –
Solomonic dynasty
Iyasu I, Emperor (1682–1706)
Tekle Haymanot I, Emperor (1706–1708)
Tewoflos, Emperor (1708–1711)
Yostos, Emperor (1711–1716)
Dawit III, Emperor (1716–1721)
Bakaffa, Emperor (1721–1730)
Iyasu II, Emperor (1730–1755)
Iyoas I, Emperor (1755–1769)
Zemene Mesafint
Yohannes II, Emperor (1769)
Tekle Haymanot II, Emperor (1769–1770)
Susenyos II, Emperor (1770)
Tekle Haymanot II, Emperor (1770–1777)
Salomon II, Emperor (1777–1779)
Tekle Giyorgis I, Emperor (1779–1784)
Iyasu III, Emperor (1784–1788)
Tekle Giyorgis I, Emperor (1788–1789)
Hezqeyas, Emperor (1789–1794)
Tekle Giyorgis I, Emperor (1794–1795)
Baeda Maryam II, Emperor (1795)
Tekle Giyorgis I, Emperor (1795–1796)
Salomon III, Emperor (1796–1797)
Yonas, Emperor (1797–1798)
Tekle Giyorgis I, Emperor (1798–1799)
Salomon III, Emperor (1799)
Demetros, Emperor (1799–1800)
Tekle Giyorgis I, Emperor (1800)
Demetros, Emperor (1800–1801)
Sultanate of Aussa (complete list) –
Kadhafo, Sultan (1734–1749)
Kadhafo Mahammad ibn Kadhafo, Sultan (1749–1779)
Aydahis ibn Kadhafo Mahammad, Sultan (1779–1801)
Kingdom of Garo (complete list) –
Leliso, Tato (1690–1720)
Wako, Tato (1720–1740)
Malko, Tato (1740–1760)
Gabito, Tato (1760–1780)
Chaso, usurper Tato, (1780–1790)
Dukamo, Tato (1790–1845)
Kingdom of Gomma (complete list) –
Mijyu, Moti (?–c.1820)
Abba Manno, Moti (c.1820–c.1840)
Kingdom of Gumma (complete list) –
Adam, Moti, Founder (late 18th century)
Oncho, Moti (c.1795)
Emirate of Harar (complete list) –
Ṭalḥa ibn ʿAbdullah, Emīr (1700–1721)
Abūbakar ibn ʿAbdullah, Emīr (1721–1732)
Khalaf ibn Abūbakar, Emīr (1732–1733)
Ḥāmid ibn Abūbakar, Emīr (1733–1747)
Yūsuf ibn Abūbakar, Emīr (1747–1755)
Aḥmed ibn Abūbakar, Emīr (1755–1782)
Maḥamed ibn Yūsuf, Emīr (1782–1783)
`Abd al-Shakur ibn Yusuf, Emīr (1783–1794)
Ahmad II ibn Muhammad, Emīr (1794–1821)
Kingdom of Jimma (complete list) –
Abba Faro, Moti (late 18th century)
Abba Magal, Moti (c.1800)
Kingdom of Kaffa (complete list) –
Gali Ginocho or Tan Ginok, King (1675–1710)
Gaki Gaocho or Otti Sheroch, King (1710–1742)
Gali Gaocho or Kanechoch, King (1742–1775)
Shagi Sherocho or Gali Keffoch, King (1775–1795)
Beshi Ginocho or Kaye Sheroch, King (1795–1798)
Hoti Gaocho or Beshi Sheroch, King (1798–1821)
Ennarea (complete list) –
Shisafocho, Hinnare-tato (early 18th century)
Sacho Nechocho, Hinnare-tato (c.1750)
Tekle Sachi, Hinnare-tato (late 18th century)
Kingdom of Welayta: Tigre dynasty (complete list) –
Kote, Kawa (18th century)
Libana, Kawa (18th century)
Tube, Kawo (?–1761)
Ogatto, Kawa (1761–1800)
Amado, Kawa (1800–1835)

Somalia (including Somaliland)

Sultanate of the Geledi (complete list) –
Ibrahim Adeer, Sultan (late 17th century–mid 18th century)
Mahamud Ibrahim, Sultan (mid-18th century–1828)
Isaaq Sultanate (complete list) – 
Guled Abdi, Sultan (~1750s-1808)

Indian Ocean

Comoros

Sultanate of Ndzuwani (complete list) –
Alimah III, Sultan/female ruler (c.1676–c.1711)
Salim of Johanna, Sultan (c.1711–c.1741)
Saidi Ahamd, Sultan (c.1741–c.1782)
Abdallah I (Alimiah), de facto ruler (c.1782–c.1788)
Halimah IV, Sultan (c.1788–c.1792)
Abdallah I (Alimiah), de facto ruler (c.1792–c.1796)
Alawi bin Husain, Sultan (1796–1816)

Madagascar

Boina Kingdom (complete list) –
Andriamandisoarivo (Tsimanata), King (c.1690–1720)
Andrianamboniarivo (Toakafa), King (c.1720–1730)
Andriamahatindriarivo, King (c.1730–1760)
Andrianahilitsy, King (c.1760–1767)
Andrianiveniarivo, King (1767–1770)
Andrianihoatra, King (1770–1771)
Andrianikeniarivo, King (1771–1777)
Andrianaginarivo, Queen (1777–1778)
Tombola, Queen (1778)
Ravahiny, Queen (c.1778–1808)
Merina Kingdom (complete list) –
Andriamasinavalona, King (1675–1710)
Andriantsimitoviaminiandriana Andriandrazaka, King (1710–1730)
Andriambelomasina, King (1730–1770)
Andrianjafynandriamanitra, King (1770–1787)
Andrianampoinimerina, King (1787–1810)

Mauritius

Isle de France (complete list) –
French colony, 1715–1810
For details see France under western Europe

Seychelles

Northcentral

Libya

Karamanli dynasty of Ottoman Tripolitania (complete list) –
Ahmed I, Pasha (1711–1745)
Mehmed, Pasha (1745–1754)
Ali I, Pasha (1754–1793)
Ali Burghul, Pasha (1793–1795)
Ahmed II, Pasha (1795)
Yusuf Karamanli, Pasha (1795–1832)

Tunisia

Eyalet of Tunis –
Ibrahim Sharif, Bey (1702–1705)
Beylik of Tunis (complete list) –
Al-Husayn I ibn Ali, Bey (1705–1735)
Abu l-Hasan Ali I, Bey (1735–1756)
Muhammad I ar-Rashid, Bey (1756–1759)
Ali II ibn Hussein, Bey (1759–1782)
Hammuda ibn Ali, Bey (1782–1814)

Northeast

Egypt

Sudan

Sultanate of Darfur (complete list) –
Ahmad Bukr, Sultan (early 18th century–c.1730)
Muhammad Dawra, Sultan (c.1730–?)
Umar Lel, Sultan (?–c.1752/3)
Abu'l Qasim, Sultan (c.1752/3–?)
Muhammad Tayrab, Sultan (?–1785/6)
Abd al-Rahman, Sultan (1785/6–c.1801)
Funj Sultanate (complete list) –
Badi III, Sultan (1692–1716)
Unsa III, Sultan (1719–1720)
Nul, Sultan (1720–1724)
Badi IV, Sultan (1724–1762)
Hamaj Regency of the Funj Sultanate
Sultans (complete list) –
Nasir, Sultan (1762–1769)
Isma'il, Sultan (1768–1776)
Adlan II, Sultan (1776–1789)
Awkal, Sultan (1787–1788)
Tayyib II, Sultan (1788–1790)
Badi V, Sultan (1790)
Nawwar, Sultan (1790–1791)
Badi VI, Sultan (1791–1798)
Ranfi, Sultan (1798–1804)
Regents (complete list) –
Muhammad Abu Likayik, Regent (1762/69–1775/6)
Badi walad Rajab, Regent (1775/6–1780)
Rajab, Regent (1780–1786/7)
Nasir, Regent (1786/7–1798)
Idris wad Abu Likayik, Regent (1798–1804)
Taqali (complete list) –
Muhammad wad Jayli, Mukūk (c.1750)
Umar I–1783, Mukūk (?–1783)
Ismail I, Mukūk (1783–1800)
Abakr I, Mukūk (1800–1820)

Northwest

Algeria

Regency of Algiers (Sultans / Governors) –
Vassal state, 1671–1830
Hadji Mustapha, Dey (1700–1710)
Deli Ibrahim, Dey (1710)
Ali Chauch, Dey (1710–1718), Pasha, (1718)
Muhammad III ben Hassan, Pasha-Dey (1718–1724)
Abdy Pasha, Pasha-Dey (1724–1732)
Ibrahim ben Ramdan, Pasha-Dey (1732–1745)
Kutchuk Ibrahim, Pasha-Dey (1745–1748)
Muhammed IV, Pasha-Dey (1748–1754)
Baba Ali II, Pasha-Dey (1754–1766)
Muhammad V ben Othman, Pasha-Dey (1766–1791)
Baba Hassan, Pasha-Dey (1791–1799)

Morocco

Morocco: Alaouite dynasty (complete list) –
Ismail Ibn Sharif, Sultan (1672–1727)
Abu'l Abbas Ahmad, Sultan (1727–1728, 1728–1729)
Abdalmalik, Sultan (1728)
Ali, Sultan (1734–1736)
Mohammed II, Sultan (1736–1738)
Zin al-Abidin, Sultan (1741)
Al-Mostadi, Sultan (1738–1740, 1742–1743, 1747–1748)
Abdallah, Sultan (1729–1734, 1736–1736, 1740–1741, 1741–1742, 1743–1747, 1748–1757)
Mohammed III, Sultan (1757–1790)
Yazid, Sultan (1790–1792)
Slimane, Sultan (1792–1822)

South

Botswana

Eswatini/ Swaziland

Kingdom of Eswatini (Swaziland)
Kings (complete list) –
Ngwane III, King (1745–1780)
Ndvungunye, King (1780–1815)
tiNdlovukati (complete list) –
LaYaka Ndwandwe, Ndlovukati (1745–1780), Queen Regent (1780)
Lomvula Mndzebele, Ndlovukati (1780–1815), Queen Regent (1815)

Lesotho

Malawi

Mozambique

Portuguese Mozambique (complete list) –
Colony, 1498–1972
For details see the Kingdom of Portugal under Southwest Europe

Namibia

Gciriku (complete list) –
Shimwemwe, ruler (1785–1805)

South Africa

Zulu Kingdom (complete list) –
 (1700s–1897)
Senzangakhona kaJama, King (1781–1816)
Dutch Cape Colony (complete list) –
British occupation, 1795–1803
Cape Colony (complete list) –
British colony, 1795–1910
For details see the United Kingdom under British Isles, Europe

Zambia

Kazembe –
Lukwesa Ilunga, Mwata (1760–1805)

Zimbabwe

Kingdom of Mutapa (complete list) –
Nyamaende Mhande, Mwenemutapa (1694–1707)
Nyenyedzi Zenda, Mwenemutapa  (1707–1711)
Baroma Mugwagwa, Mwenemutapa (1711–1712)
returns to Rozwi vassalage (1712)
Samatambira Nyamhandu I, Mwenemutapa (1712–1723)
independent of Rozwi (1720)
Samatambira Nyamhandu I, Mwenemutapa (1723–1735)
Nyatsusu, Mwenemutapa (1735–1740)
Dehwe Mapunzagutu, Mwenemutapa (1740–1759)
Rozvi Empire (complete list) –
Changamire Negamo, King (c.1700–1710)
Chirisamuru, King (c.1712–1788)
Changamire Dhafa, King (c.1790–1824)

West

Benin

Kingdom of Benin (complete list) –
Ore-Oghene, Oba (1689–1701)
Ewuakpe, Oba (1701–1712)
Ozuere, Oba (1712–1713)
Akenzua I, Oba (1713–1740)
Eresoyen, Oba (1740–1750)
Akengbuda, Oba (1750–1804)
Dahomey (complete list) –
Akaba, King (1685–1716)
Hangbe, King (1716–1718)
Agaja, King (1718–1740)
Vassal of the Oyo Empire, 1740–1823
Tegbessou, King (1740–1774)
Kpengla, King (1774–1789)
Agonglo, King (1789–1797)
Adandozan, King (1797–1818)
Hogbonu (complete list) –
Té-Agbanlin, Ahosu (1688–1729)
Hiakpon, Ahosu (1729–1739)
Lokpon, Ahosu (1739–1746)
Hude, Queen (1746–1752)
Messe, Ahosu (1752–1757)
Huyi, Ahosu (1757–1761)
Gbeyon, Ahosu (1761–1765)
Ayikpe, Ahosu (1775–1783)
Ayaton, Ahosu (1783–1794)
Huffon, Ahosu (1794–1807)
Ketu (Benin) (complete list) –
Ajibolu, Oba (1795–1816)

Burkina Faso

Kingdom of Koala (complete list) –
Balibagini, King (c.1718–c.1722)
Baadindiye, King (?)
Alfa, King (?)
Koro, King (?)
Paamba, King (c.1763–c.1781)
Yembrima, King (?)
Baalisongi, King (?)
Mossi Kingdom of Gwiriko (complete list) –
Famaghan Wattara, ruler (1714–1729)
Famaghan dan Tyeba, ruler (1729–1742)
Kere Massa Wattara, ruler (1742–1749)
Magan Wule Wattara, ruler (1749–1809)
Mossi Kingdom of Liptako (complete list) –
Brahima bi Saydu, Ja-oro (1758–1810)
Mossi Kingdom of Nungu (complete list) –
Lissoangui, Nunbado (1684–1709)
Yendabri, Nunbado (1709–c.1736)
Yembrima, Nunbado (1736–1791)
Baahamma, Nunbado (1791–1822)
Mossi Kingdom of Wogodogo (complete list) –
Naaba Dulugu, Moogo-naaba (1783–1802)
Mossi Kingdom of Yatenga (complete list) –
Naaba Yadega, Yatenga naaba (c.18th century)
Naaba Yolomfaogoma, Yatenga naaba (c.18th century)
Naaba Kourita, Yatenga naaba (18th century)
Naaba Geda, Yatenga naaba (18th century)
Naaba Wobgho I, Yatenga naaba (18th century)
Naaba Kango, Yatenga naaba (1754–1787)
Rima Naaba Saaga, Yatenga naaba (1787–1803)

Cape Verde

Portuguese Cape Verde (complete list) –
Colony, 1462–1951
For details see the Kingdom of Portugal under Southwest Europe

Gambia

Ghana

Kingdom of Ashanti (complete list) –
Osei Kofi Tutu I, Asantehene (c.1675/80–1717)
Amaniampon, Regent (1717–1720)
Opoku Ware I, Asantehene (1720–1750)
Kusi Oboadum, Asantehene (1750–1764)
Safo Kantanka, Regent (1764)
Osei Kwadwo Okoawia, Asantehene (1764–1777)
Atakora Kwame, Regent (1777)
Osei Kwame Panyin, Asantehene (1777–1803)
Denkyira (complete list) –
Ntim Gyakari, Denkyirahene (1695–1701)

Guinea

Imamate of Futa Jallon (complete list) –
Karamokho Alfa, Almami (c.1725–1751)
Ibrahim Sori, Almami (1751–1784)
Sa'id, Almami (c.1784–1797/8)

Guinea-Bissau

Portuguese Guinea (complete list) –
Colony, 1474–1951
For details see the Kingdom of Portugal under Southwest Europe

Ivory Coast

Gyaaman (complete list) –
Biri Kofi Panyin, Gyaamanhene (?–1720)
Abo Kofi, Gyaamanhene (1720–1746)
Kofi Sono, Gyaamanhene (1746–1760)
Agyeman, Gyaamanhene (1760–1790)
Biri Kofi Kadyo, Gyaamanhene (1790–1810)
Kong Empire –
Seku Wattara, leader (1710–1735)

Liberia

Mali

Bamana Empire –
Bitòn Coulibaly, Faama (1712–1755)
Dinkoro Coulibaly, Faama (1755–1757)
Ali Coulibaly, Faama (1757–c.1759)
Ngolo Diarra, Faama (1766–1795)
Mansong Diarra, Faama (1795–1808)
Da Monzon Diarra, Faama (1808–?)

Mauritania

Niger

Sultanate of Damagaram (complete list) –
Mallam, Sultan (1731–1746)
Baba dan Mallam, Sultan (1746–1757)
Tanimoun Babani, Sultan (1757–1775)
Assafa dan Tanimoun, Sultan (1775–1782)
Abaza dan Tanimoun, Sultan (1782–1787)
Mallam Babou Saba, Sultan (1787–1790)
Daouda dan Tanimoun, Sultan (1790–1799)
Ahmadou dan Tanimoun, Sultan (1799–1812)
Dendi Kingdom: Askiya dynasty (complete list) –
El Hadjj Hanga, Askiya (?–1761)
Samsou-Béri, Askiya (1761–1779)
Hargani, Askiya (1779–1793)
Samsou Keïna, Askiya (1793–1798)
Fodi Maÿroumfa, Askiya (1798–1805)
Dosso Kingdom (complete list) –
Zarmakoy Aboubacar, King (c.1750–?)
Zarmakoy Laouzo, King (?)

Nigeria

Akwa Akpa (Old Calabar) –
Ekpenyong Offiong Okoho, King (1786–1805)
Kingdom of Bonny –
The following were the independent rulers of Okoloama.
Awusa "Halliday", King (1759–1760)
Perekule I, King (1760–?)
Fubara Manilla Pepple, King (?–1792)
Opubo Annie Pepple the Great, King  (1792–1828)
Bornu Empire (Kanem–Bornu): Sayfawa dynasty
Dunama VII, Mai (1696–1715)
Hamdan, Mai (1715–1729)
Muhammad VII of Bornu, Mai (1729–1744)
Dunama VIII Gana, Mai (1744–1447)
Ali III, Mai (1747–1792)
Ahmad, Mai (1792–1808)
Gobir –
Bawa, Sultan (1777–1795)
Yakubu, Sultan (1795–1801)
Sultanate of Kano (complete list) –
Dadi, Sultan (1670–1703)
Muhammad Sharif, Sultan (1703–1731)
Kumbari, Sultan (1731–1743)
al-Hajj Kabe, Sultan (1743–1753)
Yaji II, Sultan (1753–1768)
Baba Zaki, Sultan (1768–1776)
Daud Abasama II, Sultan (1776–1781)
Muhammad al-Walid, Sultan (1781–1805)
Lagos (complete list) –
Ashipa, Oba (c.1682–1716)
Ado, Oba (1716–1755)
Gabaro, Oba (1755–1760)
Akinsemoyin, Oba (c.1760–1775)
Eletu Kekere, Oba (c.1775–1780)
Ologun Kutere, Oba (1780–1801) or until 1803
Nembe Kingdom (complete list) –
Mingi I, King (1745–1766)
Ikata Mingi II, King (1766–1788)
Gboro Mingi III, King (1788–1800)
Kuko Mingi IV, King (1800–1832)
Kingdom of Nri (complete list) –
Ezimilo, Eze Nri (1701–1723)
Èwenétem, Eze Nri (1724–1794)
Ènweleána I, Eze Nri (1795–1886)
Oyo Empire (complete list) –
Ayibi, Alaafin (17th century or 18th century)
Osiyago, Alaafin (early 18th century)
Ojigi, Alaafin (c.1728–1730)
Gberu, Alaafin (c.1730–1746)
Amuniwaiye, Alaafin (1746)
Onisile, Alaafin (1746–1754)
Labisi, Alaafin (1754)
Awonbioju, Alaafin (1754)
Agboluaje, Alaafin (1754)
Majeogbe, Alaafin (1754–1770)
Abiodun, Alaafin (c.1770–1789)
Awole Arogangan, Alaafin (1789–1796)
Adebo, Alaafin (1796–1888)
Yauri Emirate –
Muhammadu Dan Ayi dan Ahmadu Jerabana Albishir, Emir (1799–1829)

Senegal

Kingdom of Jolof (complete list) –
Bakar Penda, Buur-ba (1670–1711)
Bakan-Tam Gan, Buur-ba (1711–1721)
al-Buri Dyakher, Buur-ba (1721–1740)
Birayamb, Buur-ba (1740–1748)
Birawa Keme, Buur-ba (1748–1750)
Lat-Kodu, Buur-ba (1750–1755)
Bakaa-Tam Buri-Nyabu, Buur-ba (1755–1763)
Mba Kompass, Buur-ba (1763–1800)
Mba Buri-Nyabu, Buur-ba (1800–1818)
Cayor (complete list) –
Lat Sukabe, Damel (1697–1719)
Isa-Tende, Damel (1719–1748)
Isa Bige, Damel (1748–1749)
Ma-Bathio Samb, Damel (1749–1757)
Birima Kodu, Damel (1757–1758)
Isa Bige, Damel (1758–1759)
Birima Yamb, Damel (1759–1760)
Isa Bige Nagone, Damel (1760–1763)
Jor Yasin Isa, Damel (1763–1766)
Kodu Kumba, Damel (1766–1777)
Birima Fatim-Penda, Damel (1777–1790)
Amari Ngone Ndèla Kumba Fal, Damel (1790–1809)
Imamate of Futa Toro (complete list) –
Abdelkedir, Almaami (1776–1804)
Waalo (complete list) –
Naatago Aram Bakar, King (1674–1708)
Njak Aram Bakar Teedyek, King (1708–1733)
Yerim Nadate Bubu, King (1733–1734)
Meu Mbody Kumba Khedy, King (1734–1735)
Yerim Khode Fara Mboj, King (1735–1736)
Njak Xuri Yop, King (1736–1780)
Fara Penda Teg Rel, King (1780–c.1795)
Njak Kumba Xuri Yay Mboj, King (1795–1805)

Sierra Leone

Kingdom of Koya (complete list) –
Naimbanna I, Bai (1680–1720)
Naimbanna II, Bai (1720–1793)
Farima IV, Bai (1793–1807)

Togo

Americas

Caribbean

Antigua

Colonial Antigua (complete list) –
British colony, 1632–1981
For details see the United Kingdom under British Isles, Europe

The Bahamas

Colony of the Bahamas (complete list) –
British colony, 1648–1973
For details see the United Kingdom under British Isles, Europe

Barbados

Colonial Barbados (complete list) –
British colony, 1625–1966
For details see the United Kingdom under British Isles, Europe

Cuba

Captaincy General of Cuba (complete list) –
Spanish Colony, 1607–1898
For details see Spain in southwest Europe

Dominica

French Dominica (complete list) –
French Colony, 1715–1763
For details see France in western Europe

British Dominica (complete list) –
British Colony, 1763–1978
For details see the United Kingdom under British Isles, Europe

Saint Vincent and the Grenadines

Colonial Saint Vincent and the Grenadines (complete list) –
British Colony, 1763–1979
For details see the United Kingdom under British Isles, Europe

Haiti

Saint-Domingue (complete list) –
French Colony, 1625–1804
For details see France in western Europe

Netherlands

Curaçao and Dependencies (complete list) –
Dutch colony  1634–1828, 1845–1954
For details see the Netherlands under western Europe

Saint Lucia

French Saint Lucia (complete list) –
French colony, 1762–1802
For details see France in western Europe

Trinidad and Tobago

Colonial Trinidad and Tobago (complete list) –
British colony, 1797–1962
For details see the United Kingdom under British Isles, Europe

Central

Belize

Black River Settlements (complete list) –
British colony, 1749–1862
For details see the United Kingdom under British Isles, Europe

Guatemala

Captaincy General of Guatemala (complete list) –
Spanish Colony, 1609–1821
For details see Spain in southwest Europe

Nicaragua

Miskito Coast (complete list) –
Jeremy I, King (c.1687–1718)
Jeremy II, King (1718–1729)
Peter I, King (1729–1739)
Edward I, King (1739–1755)
George I, King (1755–1776)
George II Frederic, King (1776–1801)

North

Canada

Canada (New France)  (complete list) –
French colony, 1535–1763
For details see France under western Europe

Newfoundland Colony (complete list) –
British colony, 1610–1907
Colony of Quebec (complete list) –
British colony, 1763–1791
Upper Canada (complete list) –
British colony, 1791–1841
Lower Canada (complete list) –
British colony, 1791–1841
For details see the United Kingdom under British Isles, Europe

Mexico

Viceroyalty of New Spain (complete list) –
Spanish Colony, 1521–1821
For details see Spain in southwest Europe

United States

United States: Second Continental Congress: Presidents –
John Hancock, President (1775–1777)
Henry Laurens, President (1777–1778)
John Jay, President (1778–1779) 
Samuel Huntington, President (1779–1781)
United States: Articles of Confederation: Presidents –
Samuel Huntington, President (1781)
Thomas McKean, President (1781)
John Hanson, President (1781–1782)
Elias Boudinot, President (1782–1783)
Thomas Mifflin, President (1783–1784)
Richard Henry Lee, President (1784–1785)
John Hancock, President (1785–1786)
Nathaniel Gorham, President (1786)
Arthur St. Clair, President (1787)
Cyrus Griffin, President (1788)
United States: Constitution of the United States: President of the United States (complete list) –
George Washington, President (1789–1797)
John Adams, President (1797–1801)
Cherokee Nation (complete list) –
Little Turkey, First Beloved Man (1788–1794), Principal Chief (1794–1801)
State of Muskogee –
William Augustus Bowles, Director General (1799–1803)
Vermont Republic (complete list) –
Joseph Marsh, Governor (1778–1779, 1790–1791)
Moses Robinson, Governor (1779–1790)

South

Argentina

Viceroyalty of the Río de la Plata (complete list) –
Spanish Colony, 1776–1814
For details see Spain in southwest Europe

Brazil

Colonial Brazil (complete list) –
Portuguese colony, 1500/1534–1808
For details see the Kingdom of Portugal under Southwest Europe

Chile

Captaincy General of Chile (complete list) –
Spanish Colony, 1541–1818
For details see Spain in southwest Europe

Colombia

Viceroyalty of New Granada (complete list) –
Spanish Colony, 1717–1723, 1739–1810, 1815–1821
For details see Spain in southwest Europe

Peru

Viceroyalty of Peru (complete list) –
Spanish Colony, 1542–1824
For details see Spain in southwest Europe

Suriname

English Surinam (complete list) –
English/ British colony, 1650–1667
For details see the United Kingdom under British Isles, Europe

Dutch Surinam (complete list) –
Dutch colony 1667–1954
For details see the Netherlands under western Europe

Asia

Central

Kazakhstan

Dzungar Khanate (complete list) –
Tsewang Arabtan, Khong Tayiji (1694–1727)
Galdan Tseren, Khong Tayiji (1727–1745)
Tsewang Dorji Namjal, Khong Tayiji (1746–1749)
Lama Dorji, Khong Tayiji (1750–1753)
Dawachi, Khong Tayiji (1752–1755)
Amursana, ruler (c.1755–1757)
Kazakh Khanate (complete list) –
Tauke, Khan (1680–1718)
Junior zhuz (complete list) –
Abul Khair, Khan (1718–1748)
Nuraly, Khan (1748–1786)
Eraly, Khan (1791–1794)
Esim, Khan (1795–1797)
Aishuaq, Khan (1797–1805)
Middle zhuz (complete list) –
Sameke, Khan (1719–1734)
Abilmambet, Khan (1734–1771)
Ablai, Khan (1771–1781)
Uali, Khan (1781–1819)

Tajikistan

Yarkent Khanate, Western Moghulistan (complete list) –
Akbash, Khan (1695–1705)

Tibet

Khoshut Khanate of Tibet
Khans (complete list) –
Lha-bzang, Khan (1697–1717)
Dalai Lamas (complete list) –
Tsangyang Gyatso, 6th Dalai Lama (1697–1706)
Tibet under Qing rule (Qing emperors / Dalai Lamas) –
Manchu overlordship, 1720–1912
For details see the Qing dynasty under Eastern Asia

Uzbekistan

Khanate of Bukhara –
Subhan Quli, Khan (1680–1702)
Ubaidullah, Khan (1702–1711)
Abu'l-Faiz, Khan (1711–1747)
Muhammad Abd al-Mumin, Khan (1747–1748)
Muhammad Ubaidullah II, Khan (1748–1753, nominal)
Muhammad Rahim (usurper), atalik (1753–1756), Khan (1756–1758)
Shir Ghazi, Khan (1758-?)
Abu'l Ghazi, Khan (1758–1785)
Emirate of Bukhara –
Shah Murad bin Daniyal Bey, Amir (1785–1800)
Khanate of Kokand –
Shahrukh Bey, Khan (c.1709–1721)
Abdul Rahim Bey, Khan (c.1721–1733)
Abdul Kahrim Bey, Khan (c.1733–1750)
Abdurakhman-Batir, Khan (c.1750)
Irdana, Khan (c.1750–1752)
Bobobek, Khan (c.1752–1753)
Irdana, Khan (c.1753–1764)
Suleiman Bey, Khan (c.1764)
Shahruhk III, Khan (c.1764)
Narbuta Bey, Khan (c.1764–1801)
Khanate of Khiva (complete list) –
Ishaq Agha Shah Niyaz, Khan (1698–1701)
Awrang II, Khan (1701–1702)
rShakhbakht Khan, Khan (1702–03)
Sayyid Ali Khan, Khan (1703)
Musa, Khan (1702–1712)
Yadigar I, Khan (1712–1713)
Awrang III, Khan (c.1713–c.1714)
Haji Muhammad II, Khan (c.1714)
Shir Ghazi, Khan (1714–1727)
Sarigh Ayghir, Khan (1727)
Bahadur, Khan (1727–1728)
Ilbars II, Khan (1728–1740)
Tahir, Khan (1740–1742)
Nurali I, Khan (1742)
Abu Muhammad, Khan (1742)
Abu al-Ghazi II Muhammad, Khan (1742–1747)
Ghaib, Khan (Kaip Khan), Khan (1747–1758)
Abdullah Qara Beg, Khan (1758)
Timur Ghazi, Khan (1758–1764)
Tawke, Khan (1764–1766)
Shah Ghazi, Khan (1766–1768)
Abu al-Ghazi III, Khan (1768–1769)
Nurali II, Khan (1769)
Jahangir, Khan (1769–1770)
Bölekey, Khan (1770)
Aqim, Khan (1770–1771, c.1772–c.1773)
Abd al-Aziz, Khan (c.1771)
Artuq Ghazi, Khan (c.1772)
Abdullah, Khan (c.1772)
Aqim, Khan (1770–1771, c.1772–c.1773)
Yadigar II, Khan (c.1773–1775, 1779–1781, 1783–1790)
Abu'l Fayz, Khan (1775–1779)
Yadigar II, Khan (c.1773–1775, 1779–1781, 1783–1790)
Pulad Ghazi, Khan (1781–1783)
Yadigar II, Khan (c.1773–1775, 1779–1781, 1783–1790)
Abu al-Ghazi IV, Khan (1790–1802)
Kalmyk Khanate (complete list) –
Ayuka, Khan (1672–1723)
Tseren Donduk, Khan (1723–1735)
Donduk Ombo, Khan (1735–1741)
Donduk Dashi, Khan (1741–1761)
Ubashi, Khan (1761–1771)
Dodbi, Khan (1771–1781)
As Saray, Khan (1781)

East

China: Qing dynasty

Qing dynasty (complete list) –
Kangxi, Emperor (1661–1722)
Yongzheng, Emperor (1722–1735)
Qianlong, Emperor (1735–1796)
Jiaqing, Emperor (1796–1820)

Japan

Tokugawa shogunate of Japan
Emperors (complete list) –
Higashiyama, Emperor (1687–1709)
Nakamikado, Emperor (1709–1735)
Sakuramachi, Emperor (1735–1747)
Momozono, Emperor (1747–1762)
Go-Sakuramachi, Emperor (1762–1771)
Go-Momozono, Emperor (1771–1779)
Kōkaku, Emperor (1780–1817)
Shōguns (complete list) –
Tokugawa Tsunayoshi, Shōgun (1680–1709)
Tokugawa Ienobu, Shōgun (1709–1712)
Tokugawa Ietsugu, Shōgun (1713–1716)
Tokugawa Yoshimune, Shōgun (1716–1745)
Tokugawa Ieshige, Shōgun (1745–1760)
Tokugawa Ieharu, Shōgun (1760–1786)
Tokugawa Ienari, Shōgun (1787–1837)
Ryukyu Kingdom: Second Shō dynasty –
Vassal state of Satsuma Domain, 1609–1872
Shō Tei, King (1669–1709)
Shō Eki, King (1710–1712)
Shō Kei, King (1713–1752)
Shō Boku, King (1752–1794)
Shō On, King (1795–1802)

Korea

Joseon (complete list) –
Sukjong, King (1674–1720)
Gyeongjong, King (1720–1724)
Yeongjo, King (1724–1776)
Jeongjo, King (1776–1800)
Sunjo, King (1800–1834)

Southeast

Brunei

Bruneian Empire (complete list) –
Nassaruddin, Sultan (1690–1710)
Hussin Kamaluddin, Sultan (1710–1730, 1737–1740)
Muhammad Alauddin, Sultan (1730–1737)
Omar Ali Saifuddin I, Sultan (1740–1778)
Muhammad Tajuddin, Sultan (1778–1804, 1804–1807)

Cambodia

Kingdom of Cambodia: Middle Period (complete list) –
Chey Chettha IV, King (1675–1695, 1696–1699, 1700–1702, 1703–1706)
Thommoreachea III or Sri Dhamaraja III, King (1702–1703, 1706–1709, 1738–1747)
Barom Ramadhipati or Kaev Hua III, King (1699–1700, 1710–1722)
Satha II or Paramaraja X, King (1722–1729, 1729–1736, 1749)
Thommoreachea IV or Sri Dhamaraja IV, King (1747)
Ang Sngoun, King (1749–1755)
Ang Tong, King (1755–1758)
Outey II, King (1758–1775)
Ang Non II, King (1775–1779)
Ang Eng, King (1777–1796)

Indonesia

Dutch East Indies (complete list) –
Dutch colony 1800–1811, 1816–1949
For details see the Netherlands under western Europe

Indonesia: Java

Banten Sultanate (complete list) –
Abdul Mahasin Muhammad Zainulabidin, Sultan (1690–1733)
Abdul Fatah Muhammad Syafei, Sultan (1733–1748)
Ratu Sarifah Fatima, Regent (1748–1750)
Abu’lma’ali Muhammad Wasi al-Halimin, Sultan (1750–1753)
Abu Nazar Muhammad Arif Zainal Asyekin, Sultan (1753–1777)
Abdul Mofakhir Muhammad Aliuddin I, Sultan (1777–1802)
Blambangan Kingdom (complete list) –
Pangeran Putr, King (1697–1736)
Danuningrat, King (1736–1763)
Pangeran Wilis, King (1767–1768)
Sultanate of Cirebon: Kraton Kacirebonan (complete list) –
Pangeran Arya Cirebon, Kamaruddin, Sultan (1697–1723)
Cirebon I Muhammad Akbaruddin, Sultan (1723–1734)
Cirebon II Muhammad Salihuddin, Sultan (1734–1758)
Cirebon III Muhammad Harruddin, Sultan (1758–1768)
Cirebon, Keraton Kasepuhan (complete list) –
Sepuh II Jamaluddin, Sultan (1697–1723)
Sepuh III Muhammad Zainuddin, Sultan (1723–1753)
Sepuh IV Muhammad Zainuddin, Sultan (1753–1773)
Sepuh V Sapiuddin, Sultan (1773–1786)
Sepuh VI, Sultan (1786–1791)
Sepuh VII Joharuddin, Sultan (1791–1816)
Cirebon, Kraton Kanoman (complete list) –
Anom I Badruddin, Sultan (1662–1703)
Anom II, Sultan (1703–1706)
Anom III Muhammad Alimuddin, Sultan (1719–1732)
Anom IV Khairuddin, Sultan (1744–1797)
Anom V Imanuddin, Sultan (1797–1807)
Cirebon, Panembahan line (complete list) –
Panembahan Cirebon I Muhammad Nasruddin, Sultan (1662–1714)
Panembahan Cirebon II Muhammad Muhyiddin, Sultan (1725–1731)
Panembahan Cirebon III Muhammad Tair Yarini Sabirin, Sultan (1752–1773)
Cirebon, Panembahan line (complete list) –
Pangeran Arya Cirebon, Kamaruddin, Sultan (1697–1723)
Cirebon I Muhammad Akbaruddin, Sultan (1723–1734)
Cirebon II Muhammad Salihuddin, Sultan (1734–1758)
Cirebon III Muhammad Harruddin, Sultan (1758–1768)
Bangkalan –
Cakraningrat II, Sultan (1648–1707)
Cakraningrat III, Sultan (1707–1718)
Cakraningrat IV, Sultan (1718–1745)
Cakraningrat V, Sultan (1745–1770)
Cakraningrat VI, Sultan (1770–1780)
Cakraningrat VII, Sultan (1780–1815)
Mataram Sultanate (complete list) –
Amangkurat II, Susuhunan (1677–1703)
Amangkurat III, Susuhunan (1703–1704)
Pakubuwono I, Susuhunan (1704–1719)
Amangkurat IV, Susuhunan (1719–1726)
Pakubuwono II, Susuhunan (1726–1749)
Pakubuwono III, Susuhunan of Mataram (1749–1755); Susuhunan of Surakarta (1755–1788)
Split into Surakarta and Yogyakarta

Sumenep –
Pulang Jiwa, Sultan (1684–1702)
Cakranegara I, Sultan (1702–1705)
Suderma, Sultan (1705–1707)
Cakranegara II, Sultan (1707–1737)
Cakranegara III, Sultan (1737–1750)
Bendara Saud, Sultan (1750–1767)
Tirtanegara, Sultan (1767–1811)
Pamekasan –
Adikara I, Sultan (1685–1708)
Adikara II, Sultan (1708–1737)
Adikara III, Sultan (1737–1743)
Adikara IV, Sultan (1743–1750)
Adiningrat, Sultan (1750–1752)
Aria Cakraadiningrat I, R. Alsari, Sultan (1752–1800)
Aria Cakraadiningrat II, R. Alsana, Sultan (1800–1804)
Pasuruan –
Surapati, Wiranegara I, Sultan (1686–1706)
Wiranegara II, Sultan (1706–1707)
Surakarta Sunanate (complete list) –
Pakubuwono III, Susuhunan of Mataram (1749–1755); Susuhunan of Surakarta (1755–1788)
Pakubuwono IV, Sultan (1788–1820)
Yogyakarta Sultanate (complete list) –
Hamengkubuwono I, Sultan (1755–1792)
Hamengkubuwono II, Sultan (1792–1810, 1811–1812, 1826–1828)
Mangkunegaran (complete list) –
Mangkunegara I, Sultan (1757–1795)
Mangkunegara II, Sultan (1795–1835)

Indonesia: Sumatra

Aceh Sultanate (complete list) –
Badr ul-Alam Syarif Hasyim Jamaluddin, Sultan (1699–1702)
Perkasa Alam Syarif Lamtui, Sultan (1702–1703)
Jamal ul-Alam Badr ul-Munir, Sultan (1703–1726)
Jauhar ul-Alam, Sultan (1726)
Syamsul Alam, Sultan (1726–1727)
Alauddin Ahmad Syah, Sultan (1727–1735)
Alauddin Johan Syah, Sultan (1735–1760)
Alauddin Mahmud Syah I, Sultan (1760–1781)
Badr ul-Alam Syah, Sultan (1764–1765)
Sulaiman Syah, Sultan (1773)
Alauddin Muhammad Syah, Sultan (1781–1795)
Alauddin Jauhar ul-Alam Syah, Sultan (1795–1815, 1819–1823)
Sultanate of Deli (complete list) –
Tuanku Panglima Paderap, Sultan (1698–1728)
Tuanku Panglima Pasutan, Sultan (1728–1761)
Tuanku Panglima Gandar Wahid, Sultan (1761–1805)
Sultanate of Langkat –
Bendahara Raja Badiuzzaman, Raja (1673–1750)
Kejuruan Hitam (Tuah Hitam), Raja (1750–1818)
Sultanate of Siak Sri Indrapura (complete list) –
Abdul Jalil Rahmad Shah I, Sultan (1725–1746)
Abdul Jalil Rahmad Shah II, Sultan (1746–1765)
Abdul Jalil Jalaluddin Shah, Sultan (1765–1766)
Abdul Jalil Alamuddin Shah, Sultan (1766–1780)
Muhammad Ali Abdul Jalil Muazzam Shah, Sultan (1780–1782)
Yahya Abdul Jalil Muzaffar Shah, Sultan (1782–1784)
Al-Sayyid al-Sharif Ali Abdul Jalil Syaifuddin Ba'alawi, Sultan (1784–1810)
Sultanate of Serdang (complete list) –
Kejeruan Junjungan, Raja (1728–1782)
Al-Marhum Kacapuri, Raja (1782–1822)
Riau-Lingga Sultanate
Sultans –
Abdul Jalil Shah IV, Sultan (1699–1720)
Abdul Jalil Rahmat Shah, Sultan (1718–1722)
Sulaiman Badrul Alam Shah, Sultan (1722–1760)
Abdul Jalil Muazzam Shah, Sultan (1760–1761)
Ahmad Riayat Shah, Sultan (1761–1761)
Mahmud Shah III, Sultan (1761–1812)
Yang di-Pertuan Muda –
Daeng Marewah, Yang di-Pertuan Muda (1722–1728)
Daeng Chelak, Yang di-Pertuan Muda (1728–1745)
Daeng Kemboja, Yang di-Pertuan Muda (1745–1777)
Haji, Yang di-Pertuan Muda (1777–1784)
Ali, Yang di-Pertuan Muda (1784–1805)
Jambi Sultanate –
Sultan Sri Maharaja Batu, Sultan (1690–1721)
Ahmad Zainuddin/ Anom Sri Ingalaga, Sultan (1770–1790)
Ratu Seri Ingalaga, Sultan (1790–1812)

Indonesia: Kalimantan (Borneo)

Sultanate of Banjar (complete list) –
Tahmidullah I, Sultan (1700–1717)
Panembahan Kasuma Dilaga, Sultan (1717–1730)
Hamidullah, Sultan (1730–1734)
Tamjidullah I, Sultan (1734–1759)
Muhammadillah/Muhammad Aliuddin Aminullah, Sultan (1759–1761)
Tahmidullah II/Sultan Nata, Sultan (1761–1801)
Bulungan –
Digendung, putra Wira Keranda, Wira (1695–1731)
Amir, Putera Wira Digendung Gelar Sultan Amiril Mukminin, Wira (1731–1777)
Aji Muhammad, Sultan (1777–1817)
Kutai Kartanegara Sultanate –
Aji Muhammad Idris, Sultan (c.1732–1739)
Aji Muhammad Muslihuddin, Sultan (1780s)
Lanfang Republic –
Luo Fangbo, President (1777–1795)
Jiang Wubo, President (1795–1799)
Yan Sibo, President (1799–1804)
Pontianak Sultanate (complete list) –
Syarif Abdurrahman Alkadrie, Sultan (1771–1808)
Sultanate of Sambas (complete list) –
Muhammad Taj ud-din I, Sultan (1685–1708)
Umar Aqam ud-din I, Sultan (1708–1732)
Abu Bakar Kamal ud-din I, Sultan (1732–1764)
Umar Akam ud-din II, Sultan (1764–1786)
Achmad Taj ud-din II, Sultan (1786–1793)
Abu Bakar Taj ud-din I, Sultan (1793–1815)
Sultanate of Sintang –
Sri Paduka Muhammad Shams ud-din Sa'id ul-Khairiwaddien Sultan Nata, Sultan (1672–1738)
Sri Paduka 'Abdu'l Rahman Muhammad Jalal ud-din ibni al-Marhum Muhammad Shams ud-din Sa'id ul-Khairiwaddien Aman, Sultan (1738–1786)
Sri Paduka 'Abdu'l Rashid Muhammad Jamal ud-din ibni al-Marhum 'Abdu'l Rahman Muhammad Jalal ud-din Ajib, Sultan (1786–1796)
Sri Paduka Muhammad Qamar ud-din ibni al-Marhum Sultan 'Abdu'l Rashid Muhammad Jamal ud-din, Sultan (1796–1851)

Indonesia: Sulawesi

Sultanate of Gowa –
Abdul Jalil, Sultan (1677–1709)
Ismail, Sultan (1709–1711)
Sirajuddin, Sultan (1711–?)
Najamuddin, Sultan (18th century)
Sirajuddin, Sultan (1735–1735)
Abdul Khair, Sultan (1735–1742)
Abdul Kudus, Sultan (1742–1753)
Amas Madina Batara Gowa, Sultan (1753–1767)
I Mallisujawa Daeng Riboko Arungmampu, Sultan (1767–1769)
Zainuddin, Sultan (1770–1778)
I Manawari Karaeng Bontolangkasa, Sultan (1778–1810)
Luwu –
Settiaraja, Datu (1663–1704)
La Onro Topalaguna, Datu (1704–1715)
Batari Tungke, Datu (1706–1715)
Batari Tojang, Datu (1715–1748)
We Tenri Leleang, Datu (1748–1778)
Tosibengngareng, Datu (1760–1765)
La Tenri Peppang, Datu (1778–1810)

Indonesia: Lesser Sunda Islands

Kingdom of Larantuka –
Domingos Viera, Raja (c.1702)
Bima Sultanate (complete list) –
Hasanuddin Muhammad Ali Syah, Sultan (1697–1731)
Alauddin Muhammad Syah, Sultan (1731–1748)
Kamalat Syah, Sultan (1748–1751)
Abdul Kadim Muhammad Syah, Sultan (1751–1773)
Abdul Hamid Muhammad Syah, Sultan (1773–1817)

Indonesia: West Timor

Wehali –
Jacinto Correia, Liurai (c.1756)
Amanatun (complete list) –
Don Louis Nai Konof, Raja (pre-1751–1766)
Don Joan Benao, Raja (1766–?)
Amarasi (complete list) –
Dom Affonco, Raja (c.1703)
Dom Augusto Fernandes, Raja (c.1703)
Nai Soti, Raja (c.1714)
Dom Luís Hornay, Raja (pre-1749–1752)
Dom Affonco Hornay, Raja (1752–1774)
Don Rote Ruatefu, Raja (1774–1802)
Amabi (complete list) –
Ama Kefi Meu, Raja (1666–1704)
Ama Kefi, Raja (1704–1725)
Loti, Raja (1725–1732)
Nai Balas, Raja (1732–1755)
Balthazar Loti, Raja (1755–1790)
Osu I, Raja (1791–1795)
Slolo, Raja (1795–c.1797)
Afu Balthazar, Raja (c.1797–pre-1824)
Sonbai Besar (complete list) –
Dom Pedro Sonbai/ Tomenu, Emperor (c.1704–1726)
Dom Alfonso Salema/ Nai Bau Sonbai, Emperor (pre-1748–1752)
Don Bernardo/ Nai Sobe Sonbai I, Emperor (1752–1760)
Albertus Johannes Taffy/ Nai Tafin Sonbai, Emperor (1760–1768)
Alphonsus Adrianus/ Nai Kau Sonbai, Emperor (1768–1802)
Sonbai Kecil (complete list) –
Bi Sonbai/ Usi Tetu Utang, Queen (1672–1717)
Bernardus Leu, Raja (1717–1726)
Corneo Leu, Raja (1728–1748)
Daniel Taffy Leu, Raja (1748–1760)
Jacobus Albertus Taffy, Raja (1760–1776)
Nai Kau Sonbai, Raja (1776–1783)
Baki Bena/ Bernardus Nisnoni, Raja (1783–1795)
Dirk Hendrik Aulasi, Raja (1795–1798)
Nube Bena/ Pieter Nisnoni I, Raja (1798–1820)
Amanuban (complete list) –
Don Michel, Raja (pre-1749–1751)
Don Louis, Raja (1751–1770)
Don Jacobus Albertus, Raja (1770–1786)
Tobani, Raja (1786–c.1807)

Indonesia: Maluku Islands

Sultanate of Bacan (complete list) –
Dutch protectorate 1667–1942
Alauddin II, Sultan (1660–1706)
Musa Malikuddin, Sultan (1706–1715)
Kie Nasiruddin, Sultan (1715–1732)
Hamza Tarafan Nur, Sultan (1732–1741)
Muhammad Sahaddin, Sultan (1741–1780)
Skandar Alam, Sultan (1780–1788)
Muhammad Badaruddin, Sultan (1788–1797)
Kamarullah, Sultan (1797–1826)
Sultanate of Jailolo –
British occupation 1799–1802
Muhammad Arif Bila, Sultan (1797–1806)
Sultanate of Tidore (complete list) –
Dutch protectorate 1657–1905
Hamza Faharuddin, Sultan (1689–1705)
Abdul Falali Mansur, Sultan (1705–1708)
Hasanuddin, Sultan (1708–1728)
Amir Muiduddin Malikulmanan, Sultan (1728–1757)
Amir Muhammad Masud Jamaluddin, Sultan (1757–1779)
Gayjira, Sultan (regent 1779–1780)
Patra Alam, Sultan (1780–1783)
Hairul Alam Kamaluddin, Sultan (1784–1797)
Nuku, Muhammad al-Mabus Amiruddin Syah, Sultan (1797–1805)
Sultanate of Ternate (complete list) –
Dutch protectorate 1683–1915
Said Fathullah, Sultan (1689–1714)
Amir Iskandar Zulkarnain Saifuddin, Sultan (1714–1751)
Ayan Shah, Sultan (1751–1754)
Syah Mardan, Sultan (1755–1763)
Jalaluddin, Sultan (1763–1774)
Harun Shah, Sultan (1774–1781)
Achral, Sultan (1781–1796)
Muhammad Yasin, Sultan (1796–1801)

Laos

Lan Xang (complete list) –
Setthathirath II, King (1700–1707)
Kingdom of Vientiane (complete list) –
Setthathirath II, King (1707–1735)
Ong Long, King (1735–1767)
Vassal to Burma (1765–1768)
Ong Boun, King (1767–1778, 1780–1781)
Vassal to Siam (1778–1826)
Phraya Supho, Siamese Governor (1778–1780) 
Ong Boun, King (1767–1778, 1780–1781)
Nanthasen, King (1781–1794)
Intharavong, King (1795–1805)
Muang Phuan (complete list) –
Kham Sattha, King (1723–1751)
Ong Lo, King (1751–1779)
Somphou, King (1779–1803)
Kingdom of Champasak (complete list) –
Nokasad, King (1713–1737)
Sayakumane, King (1737–1791)
Fay Na, King (1791–1811)
Kingdom of Luang Phrabang (complete list) –
Kingkitsarat, King (1707–1713)
Ong Kham, King (1713–1723)
Inthasom, King (1723–1749)
Inthaphom, King (1749)
Sotika Koumane, King (1749–1771)
Vassal to Burma (1765–1779)
Suriyawong, King (1771–1779)
Anourouth, King (1791–1817)

Malaysia: Peninsular

Kedah Sultanate (complete list) –
Abdullah Mu'adzam Shah, Sultan, (1698–1706)
Ahmad Tajuddin Halim Shah I, Sultan, (1706–1710)
Muhammad Jiwa Zainal Adilin Mu'adzam Shah II, Sultan, (1710–1778)
Abdullah Mukarram Shah, Sultan, (1778–1797)
Dziaddin Mukarram Shah II, Sultan, (1797–1803)
Kelantan Sultanate (complete list) –
Champa dynasty
Omar Ibni Al-Marhum Raja Sakti I, Sultan (1675–1721)
Patani dynasty
Long Bahar, Raja (1721–1734)
Long Sulaiman, Raja (1734–1739, 1746–1756)
Raja Long Pandak|Long Pandak, Sultan (1756–1758)
Raja Long Muhammad|Long Muhammad, Sultan (1758–1763)
Raja Long Yunus|Long Yunus, Sultan (1765–1795)
Tengku Muhammad, Sultan (1795–1800)
Muhammad I, Sultan (1800–1835)
Johor Sultanate (complete list) –
Abdul Jalil Shah IV, Sultan (1699–1720)
Abdul Jalil Rahmat Shah I, Sultan (1718–1722)
Sulaiman Badrul Alam Shah, Sultan (1722–1760)
Abdul Jalil Muazzam Shah, Sultan (1760–1761)
Ahmad Riayat Shah, Sultan (1761–1761)
Mahmud Shah III, Sultan (1761–1812)
Perak Sultanate: Siak dynasty (complete list) –
Mahmud Iskandar Shah, Sultan (1653–1720)
Alauddin Mughayat Shah, Sultan (1720–1728)
Muzaffar Riayat Shah III, Sultan of Upper Perak (1728–1752)
Muhammad Mughayat Shah, Sultan of Lower Perak (1744–1750)
Iskandar Zulkarnain, Sultan (1752–1765)
Mahmud Shah II, Sultan (1765–1773)
Alauddin Mansur Shah Iskandar Muda, Sultan (1773–1786)
Ahmaddin Shah, Sultan (1786–1806)
Terengganu Sultanate (complete list) –
Zainal Abidin I, Sultan (1725–1733)
Mansur Shah I, Sultan (1733–1793)
Zainal Abidin II, Sultan (1793–1808)
Selangor Sultanate (complete list) –
Raja Lumu, Sultan (1745–1778)
Ibrahim Shah, Sultan (1778–1826)
Negeri Sembilan (complete list) –
Melewar, Yamtuan (1773–1795)
Hitam, Yamtuan (1795–1808)
Perlis (complete list) –
Syed Abu Bakar Harun Jamalullail, Penghulu (1797–1825)

Myanmar / Burma

Kingdom of Mrauk U (complete list) –
Sanda Wimala I, King (1700–1707)
Sanda Thuriya II, King (1707–1710)
Sanda Wizaya, King (1710–1731)
Sanda Thuriya III, King (1731–1734)
Naradipati II, King (1734–1735)
Narapawara, King (1735–1737)
Sanda Wizala, King (1737–1738)
Madarit, King (1738–1743)
Nara Apaya, King (1743–1761)
Thirithu, King (1761–1762)
Sanda Parama, King (1762–1764)
Apaya, King (1764–1774)
Sanda Thumana, King (1774–1777)
Sanda Wimala II, King (1777–1777)
Sanda Thaditha, King (1777–1782)
Maha Thammada, King (1782–1785)
Toungoo dynasty (complete list) –
Sanay Min, King (1698–1714)
Taninganway Min, King (1714–1733)
Mahadhammaraza Dipadi, King (1733–1752)
Restored Hanthawaddy Kingdom (complete list) –
Smim Htaw Buddhaketi, King (1740–1747)
Binnya Dala, King (1747–1757)
Konbaung dynasty (complete list) –
Alaungpaya, King (1752–1760)
Naungdawgyi, King (1760–1763)
Hsinbyushin, King (1763–1776)
Singu, King (1776–1782)
Phaungka, King (1782)
Bodawpaya, King (1782–1819)

Philippines

Sultanate of Sulu (complete list) –
Shahab ud-Din, Sultan (1685–1710)
Mustafa Shafi ud-Din, Sultan (1710–1718)
Badar ud-Din I, Sultan (1718–1732)
Nasar ud-Din, Sultan (1732–1735)
Azim ud-Din I, Sultan (1735–1748, 1764–1773)
Bantilan Muizzud-Din, Sultan (1748–1763)
Mohammad Israel, Sultan (1773–1778)
Azim ud-Din II, Sultan (1763–1764, 1778–1791)
Sharap ud-Din, Sultan (1789–1808)
Sultanate of Maguindanao (complete list) –
Kahar Ud-din Kuda, Sultan (?–1702)
Bayan Ul-Anwar, Sultan (1702–1736)
Muhammad Tahir Ud-din, Sultan (1736–?)
Pakir Maulana Kamsa, Sultan (1734–1755)
Pahar Ud-din, Sultan (1755–?)
Kibad Sahriyal, Sultan (c.1780–c.1805)
Spanish East Indies, part of the Captaincy General of the Philippines (complete list) –
Colony, 1565–1901
For details see Spain in southwest Europe

Thailand

Ayutthaya Kingdom: Ban Phlu Luang dynasty (complete list) –
Phetracha, King (1688–1703)
Suriyenthrathibodi, King (1703–1709)
Thai Sa, King (1709–1733)
Borommakot, King (1733–1758)
Uthumphon, King (1758)
Ekkathat, King (1758–1767)
Lan Na: Burmese rule (complete list) –
Che Putarai, King (1675–1707)
Mang Raenra, King (1707–1727)
Thepsing, King (1727)
Ong Kham, King (1727–1759)
Ong Chan, King (1759–1761)
Khihut, King (1761–1763)
Po Aphaikhamini, King (1763–1768)
Po Mayu-nguan, King (1768–1775)
Lampang –
Thipchang, King (1732–1759)
Chaikaeo, Prince (1759–1774)
Kawila, Prince of Lampang (1774–1782), King of Chiang Mai (1802–1813)
Pattani Kingdom: First Kelantanese dynasty (complete list) –
Emas Kelantan, Raja (1690–1704 or 1670–1698)
Emas Chayam, Queen (1704–1707 or 1698–1702 and 1716–1718)
Dewi, Raja (1707–1716)
Bendang Badan, Raja (1716–1720 or ?–1715)
Laksamana Dajang, Raja (1720–1721)
Alung Yunus, Raja (1718/28–1729)
Yunus, Raja (1729–1749)
Long Nuh, Raja (1749–1771)
Muhammad, Sultan (1771–1785)
Tengku Lamidin, ruler (1785–1791)
Datuk Pengkalan, ruler (1791–1808)
Rattanakosin Kingdom of Siam (complete list) –
Rama I, King (1782–1809)
Thonburi Kingdom (complete list) –
Taksin, King (1767–1782)

Timor

Portuguese Timor (complete list) –
Colony, 1702–1975
For details see the Kingdom of Portugal under Southwest Europe

Vietnam

Champa (complete list) –
Po Saktirai da putih, King (1695–1728)
Po Ganvuh da putih, King (1728–1730)
Po Thuttirai, King (1731–1732)
Po Rattirai, King (1735–1763)
Po Tathun da moh-rai, King (1763–1765)
Po Tithuntirai da paguh, King (1765–1780)
Po Tithuntirai da parang, King (1780–1781)
Chei Krei Brei, King (1783–1786)
Po Tithun da parang, King (1786–1793)
Po Lathun da paguh, King (1793–1799)
Po Chong Chan, King (1799–1822)
Đại Việt: Revival Lê dynasty (complete list) –
Lê Hi Tông, Emperor (1676–1704)
Lê Dụ Tông, Emperor (1705–1728)
Lê Duy Phường, Emperor (1729–1732)
Lê Thuần Tông, Emperor (1732–1735)
Lê Ý Tông, Emperor (1735–1740)
Lê Hiển Tông, Emperor (1740–1786)
Lê Mẫn Đế, Emperor (1787–1789)
Đàng Ngoài: Trịnh lords (complete list) –
Trịnh Căn, Lord (1682–1709)
Trịnh Cương, Lord (1709–1729)
Trịnh Giang, Lord (1729–1740)
Trịnh Doanh, Lord (1740–1767)
Trịnh Sâm, Lord (1767–1782)
Trịnh Cán, Lord (1782)
Trịnh Khải, Lord (1782–1786)
Trịnh Bồng, Lord (1786–1787)
Đại Việt: Tây Sơn dynasty (complete list) –
Nguyễn Nhạc, Emperor (1778–1788)
Nguyễn Huệ, Emperor (1788–1792)
Nguyễn Quang Toản, Emperor (1792–1802)
Đàng Trong: Nguyễn lords (complete list) –
Nguyễn Phúc Chu, Lord (1691–1725)
Nguyễn Phúc Chú, Lord (1725–1738)
Nguyễn Phúc Khoát, Lord (1738–1765)
Nguyễn Phúc Thuần, Lord (1765–1777)
Nguyễn Phúc Dương, Lord (1776–1777)

South

Afghanistan

Hotak dynasty (complete list) –
Mirwais Hotak, Emir (1709–1715)
Abdul Aziz Hotak, Emir (1715–1717)
Mahmud Hotaki, Emir (1717–1725)
Ashraf Hotaki, Emir (1725–1729)
Hussain Hotaki, Emir (1729–1738)
Durrani Empire (complete list) –
Ahmad Shah Durrani, Emir (1738–1772)
Timur Shah Durrani, Emir (1772–1793)
Zaman Shah Durrani, Emir (1793–1801)

Sri Lanka

Dutch Ceylon (complete list) –
Colony, 1656–1796
For details see the Dutch Republic under Western Europe

West

Bahrain

Hakims of Bahrain (complete list) –
Ahmed ibn Muhammad ibn Khalifa, Hakim (1783–1796)
Sulman ibn Ahmad Al Khalifa, Hakim (1796–1825)
Abdullah ibn Ahmad Al Khalifa, Hakim (1796–1843)

Cyprus

Iran

Safavid Iran (complete list) –
Sultan Husayn, Shah (1694–1722)
Tahmasp II, Shah (1722–1732)
Abbas III, Shah (1732–1736)
Persia: Afsharid dynasty (complete list) –
Nader Shah, Shah (1736–1747)
Adil Shah, Shah (1747–1748)
Ebrahim Afshar, Shah (1748)
Shahrokh Afshar, Shah (1748–1796)
Persia: Zand dynasty (complete list) –
Karim Khan Zand, Shah (1751–1779)
Mohammad Ali Khan Zand, Shah (1779)
Abol-Fath Khan Zand, Shah (1779)
Sadeq Khan Zand, Shah (1779–1782)
Ali-Morad Khan Zand, Shah (1782–1785)
Jafar Khan, Shah (1785–1789)
Sayed Morad Khan, Shah (1789)
Lotf Ali Khan, Shah (1789–1794)
Persia: Qajar dynasty (complete list) –
Agha Mohammad Khan, Shah (1789–1797)
Fath-Ali, Shah (1797–1834)
Baban (complete list) –
Sulaiman Baba, Prince (1670–1703)
Khana Mohammad Pasha, Prince (1721–1731)
Nawaub Khalid Pasha, Prince (1732–1742)
Nawaub Salim Pasha, Prince (1742–1754)
Nawaub Sulaiman Pasha, Prince (1754–1765)
Muhammad Pasha, Prince (1765–1775)
Abdolla Pasha, Prince (1775–1777)
Ahmad Pasha, Prince (1777–1780)
Mahmoud Pasha, Prince (1780–1782)
Ibrahim Pasha, Prince (1782–1803)

Iraq

Israel

Jordan

Kuwait

Sheikhdom of Kuwait (complete list) –
Sabah I, Sheikh (1752–1762)
Abdullah I, Sheikh (1762–1814)

Lebanon

Oman

Omani Empire and Imamate of Oman: Yaruba dynasty (complete list) –
Saif bin Sultan, Imam (1692–1711)
Sultan bin Saif II, Imam (1711–1718)
Saif bin Sultan II, Imam (1718–1719)	First reign
Muhanna bin Sultan, Imam (1719–1720)
Saif bin Sultan II, Imam (1720–1722)	Second reign
Ya'arab bin Bel'arab, Imam (1722–1722)
Saif bin Sultan II, Imam (1722–1724)	Third reign
Muhammad bin Nasir, Imam (1724–1728)	Not a member of the dynasty
Saif bin Sultan II, Imam (1728–1742)	Fourth reign; at first in the coastal area only
Bal'arab bin Himyar, Imam (1728–1737)	First reign; in the interior
Sultan bin Murshid, Imam (1742–1743)
Bal'arab bin Himyar, Imam (1743–1749)	Second reign; in the interior
Omani Empire and Imamate of Oman: Al Busaidi dynasty (complete list) –
Ahmad bin Said, Sultan (1749–1783)
Said bin Ahmad, Sultan (1783–1784)
Hamad bin Said, Sultan (1784–1792)
Sultan bin Ahmad, Sultan (1792–1804)

Qatar

Saudi Arabia

Bani Khalid Emirate (complete list) –
Sa'dun bin Muhammad, Emir (1691–1722)
Ali bin Muhammad, Emir (1722–1736)
Suleiman bin Muhammad, Emir (1736–1752)
Urayar bin Dajeen bin Saadoun, Emir (1752–1774)
Bateen Bin Urayer, Emir (1775–1793)
Dajeen bin Urayer, Emir (1774–1774)
Sa'dun bin Urayer, Emir (1774–1786)
Dwaihis Bin Urayer, Emir (1786–1789)
Muhammad Bin Urayer, Emir (1786–1789)
Abdul Mohsen bin Sadah, Emir (1786–1791)
Zaid bin Urayer, Emir (1789–1793)
Barak bin Abdul Mohsen Al-Sadah, Emir (1793–1796)
Emirate of Diriyah (complete list) –
Muhammad bin Saud, Imam (1744–1765)
Abdul-Aziz bin Muhammad, Imam (1765–1803)

Syria

Turkey

Ottoman Empire
Sultans –
Mustafa II, Sultan (1695–1703)
Ahmed III, Sultan (1703–1730)
Mahmud I, Sultan (1730–1754)
Osman III, Sultan (1754–1757)
Mustafa III, Sultan (1757–1774)
Abdul Hamid I, Sultan (1774–1789)
Selim III, Sultan (1789–1807)
Grand Viziers –
Amcazade Köprülü Hüseyin Pasha, Grand Vizier (1697–1702)
Daltaban Mustafa Pasha, Grand Vizier (1702–1703)
Rami Mehmed Pasha, Grand Vizier (1703)
Sührablı Kavanoz Nişancı Ahmed Pasha, Grand Vizier (1703)
Damat Hasan Pasha, Grand Vizier (1703–1704)
Kalaylıkoz Hacı Ahmed Pasha, Grand Vizier (1704)
Baltaji Mehmet Pasha, Grand Vizier (1704–1706)
Çorlulu Ali Pasha, Grand Vizier (1706–1710)
Köprülü Numan Pasha, Grand Vizier (1710)
Baltaji Mehmet Pasha, Grand Vizier (1710–1711)
Ağa Yusuf Pasha, Grand Vizier (1711–1712)
Nişancı Süleyman Pasha, Grand Vizier (1712–1713)
Kel Hoca Ibrahim Pasha, Grand Vizier (1713)
Silahdar Damat Ali Pasha, Grand Vizier (1713–1716)
Hacı Halil Pasha, Grand Vizier (1716–1717)
Tevkii Nişancı Mehmed Pasha, Grand Vizier (1717–1718)
Nevşehirli Damat Ibrahim Pasha, Grand Vizier (1718–1730)
Silahdar Damat Mehmet Pasha, Grand Vizier (1730–1731)
Kabakulak Ibrahim Pasha, Grand Vizier (1731)
Topal Osman Pasha, Grand Vizier (1731–1732)
Hekimoğlu Ali Pasha, Grand Vizier (1732–1735)
Gürcü Ismail Pasha, Grand Vizier (1735–1736)
Silahdar Seyyid Mehmed Pasha, Grand Vizier (1736–1737)
Muhsinzade Abdullah Pasha, Grand Vizier (1737)
Yeğen Mehmed Pasha, Grand Vizier (1737–1739)
Ivaz Mehmed Pasha, Grand Vizier (1739–1740)
Nişancı Ahmed Pasha, Grand Vizier (1740–1742)
Hekimoğlu Ali Pasha, Grand Vizier (1742–1743)
Seyyid Hasan Pasha, Grand Vizier (1743–1746)
Tiryaki Hacı Mehmed Pasha, Grand Vizier (1746–1747)
Seyyid Abdullah Pasha, Grand Vizier (1747–1750)
Divitdar Mehmed Emin Pasha, Grand Vizier (1750–1752)
Çorlulu Köse Bahir Mustafa Pasha, Grand Vizier (1752–1755)
Hekimoğlu Ali Pasha, Grand Vizier (1755)
Naili Abdullah Pasha, Grand Vizier (1755)
Silahdar Bıyıklı Ali Pasha, Grand Vizier (1755)
Yirmisekizzade Mehmed Said Pasha, Grand Vizier (1755–1756)
Çorlulu Köse Bahir Mustafa Pasha, Grand Vizier (1756–1757)
Koca Ragıp Pasha, Grand Vizier (1757–1763)
Tevkii Hamza Hamid Pasha, Grand Vizier (1763)
Çorlulu Köse Bahir Mustafa Pasha, Grand Vizier (1763–1765)
Muhsinzade Mehmed Pasha, Grand Vizier (1765–1768)
Silahdar Hamza Mahir Pasha, Grand Vizier (1768)
Yağlıkçızade Nişancı Hacı Mehmed Emin Pasha, Grand Vizier (1768–1769)
Moldovancı Ali Pasha, Grand Vizier (1769)
Ivazzade Halil Pasha, Grand Vizier (1769–1770)
Silahdar Mehmed Pasha, Grand Vizier (1770–1771)
Muhsinzade Mehmed Pasha, Grand Vizier (1771–1774)
Izzet Mehmed Pasha, Grand Vizier (1774–1775)
Moralı Derviş Mehmed Pasha, Grand Vizier (1775–1777)
Darendeli Cebecizade Mehmed Pasha, Grand Vizier (1777–1778)
Kalafat Mehmed Pasha, Grand Vizier (1778–1779)
Silahdar Karavezir Seyyid Mehmed Pasha, Grand Vizier (1779–1781)
Izzet Mehmed Pasha, Grand Vizier (1781–1782)
Yeğen Hacı Mehmed Pasha, Grand Vizier (1782)
Halil Hamid Pasha, Grand Vizier (1782–1785)
Hazinedar Şahin Ali Pasha, Grand Vizier (1785–1786)
Koca Yusuf Pasha, Grand Vizier (1786–1789)
Kethüda Meyyit Hasan Pasha, Grand Vizier (1789)
Hassan Pasha of Algiers, Grand Vizier (1789–1790)
Çelebizade Şerif Hasan Pasha, Grand Vizier (1790–1791)
Koca Yusuf Pasha, Grand Vizier (1791–1792)
Melek Mehmed Pasha, Grand Vizier (1792–1794)
Safranbolulu Izzet Mehmet Pasha, Grand Vizier (1794–1798)
Kör Yusuf Ziyaüddin Pasha, Grand Vizier (1798–1805)

United Arab Emirates

Emirate of Abu Dhabi –
Dhiyab bin Isa Al Nahyan, ruler (1761–1793) 
Shakhbut bin Dhiyab Al Nahyan, ruler (1793–1816)
Emirate of Sharjah –
Rashid bin Matar Al Qasimi, ruler (1747–1777)
Saqr bin Rashid Al Qasimi, ruler (1777–1803)
Umm Al Quwain –
Rashid bin Majid Al Mualla, ruler (1768–1820)
Emirate of Ras Al Khaimah –
Rahma Al Qasimi, ruler (1708–1731)
Matar bin Butti Al Qasimi, ruler (1731–1747)
Rashid bin Matar Al Qasimi, ruler (1747–1777)
Saqr bin Rashid Al Qasimi, ruler (1777–1803)

Yemen

Upper Aulaqi Sheikhdom (complete list) –
Daha, Amir (18th century)
Yaslam ibn Daha, Amir (?)
`Ali ibn Yaslam, Amir (?)
`Amm Dayb ibn `Ali al-Yaslami al-`Awlaqi, Amir (?)
Upper Aulaqi Sultanate (complete list) –
Munassar, Sultan (18th century)
Wahidi Balhaf of Ba´l Haf (complete list) –
al-Hadi ibn Salih al-Wahidi, Sultan (c.1670–1706)
al-Hasan ibn al-Hadi al-Wahidi, Sultan (1706–1766)
al-Husayn ibn al-Hasan al-Wahidi, Sultan (1766–1771)
Sa`id ibn al-Hasan al-Wahidi, Sultan (1771–1771)
Ahmad ibn al-Hadi al-Wahidi, Sultan (1771–1810)
Emirate of Beihan (complete list) –
Hasan, Amir (?)
Ghalib, Amir (c.1750–1800)
Hussein, Amir (c.1800–1820)
Kathiri (complete list) –
Badr ibn Dscha'far al-Kathir, Sultan (1690–1707)
'Abdllah ibn Badr al-Kathir, Sultan (1707–1725)
'Amr ibn Badr al-Kathir, Sultan (1725–1760)
Ahmad ibn 'Amr al-Kathir, Sultan (1760–1800)
Muhsin ibn Ahmad al-Kathir, Sultan (1800–1830)
Sultanate of Lahej –
al-Fadl I ibn 'Ali al-Sallami al-'Abdali, Sultan (1728–1742)
'Abd al-Karim I ibn al-Fadl al-'Abdali, Sultan (1742–1753)
'Abd al-Hadi ibn 'Abd al-Karim al-'Abdali, Sultan (1753–1775)
al-Fadl II ibn 'Abd al-Karim al-'Abdali, Sultan (1775–1791)
Ahmad I ibn 'Abd al-Karim al-'Abdali, Sultan (1791–1827)
Mahra Sultanate –
`Afrar al-Mahri, Sultan (c.1750–1780)
Taw`ari ibn `Afrar al-Mahri, Sultan (c.1780–1800)
Lower Yafa –
Qahtan ibn Afif, ruler (1700–1720)
Sayf ibn Qahtan al-Afifi, ruler (1720–1740)
Ma`awda ibn Sayf al-Afifi, ruler (1740–1760)
Ghalib ibn Ma`awda al-Afifi, ruler (1760–1780)
Abd al-Karim ibn Ghalib al-Afifi, ruler (1780–1800)
Ali I ibn Ghalib al-Afifi, ruler (1800–1841)
Upper Yafa –
`Ali ibn Ahmad ibn Harhara, Sheikh (c.1730–1735)
Ahmad ibn `Ali Al Harhara, Sheikh (c.1735–1750)
Salih ibn Ahmad Al Harhara, Sheikh (c.1750–1780)
`Umar ibn Salih Al Harhara, Sheikh (c.1780–1800)
Yemeni Zaidi State (complete list) –
al-Mahdi Muhammad, Imam (1689–1718)
al-Mutawakkil al-Qasim, Imam (1716–1727)
al-Mansur al-Husayn II, Imam (1727–1748)
al-Mahdi Abbas, Imam (1748–1775)
al-Mansur Ali I, Imam (1775–1809)

Europe

Balkans

Croatia

Kingdom of Croatia (Habsburg)
Kings (complete list) –
part of the Habsburg monarchy, also part of the Lands of the Hungarian Crown
House of Habsburg
Leopold I, King (1657–1705)
Joseph I, King (1705–1711)
Charles III, King (1711–1740)
Maria Theresa, Queen (1740–1780)
House of Habsburg-Lorraine
Joseph II, King (1780–1790)
Leopold II, King (1790–1792)
Francis, King (1792–1835)
Bans (complete list) –
Adam II. Batthyány, Ban (1693–1703)
Ivan Pálffy, Ban (1704–1732)
Ivan V Drašković, Ban (1732–1733)
Josef Esterházy, Ban (1733–1741)
György Branyng, Ban (1741–1742)
Károly József Batthyány, Ban (1743-1756)
Ferenc Nádasdy, Ban (1756–1783)
Ferenc Esterházy, Ban (1783-1785)
Ferenc Balassa, Ban (1785-1790)
Ivan Erdődy, Ban (1790–1806)
Republic of Ragusa (complete list) –
Vlaho Gozze, Rector (1702)
Džono Gozze, Rector (1703)
Đivo Menze, Rector (1706)
Frano Tudisi, Rector (1707)
Džono Gozze, Rector (1708)
Đivo Menze, Rector (1709)
Luko Marina Sorga, Rector (1710)
Đivo Gozze, Rector (1726)
Đivo Basilio, Rector (1727)
Vlađ Sorgo, Rector (1728)
Đivo Gozze, Rector (1729)
Giunio Resti, Rector (1730)
Vlaho Menze, Rector (1752)
Jako Basilio, Rector (1754)
Đivo Bucchia, Rector (1755)
Marin Brna Caboge, Rector (1756)
Niko Gozze, Rector (1757)
Baldo Bucchia, Rector (1758)
Orsat Cerva, Rector (1759)
Đivo Sorgo, Rector (1761)
Mato Zamagna, Rector (1762)
Miho Zamagna, Baldo Gozze, Rector (1763)
Niko Proculo, Rector (1764)
Luko Giorgi, Rector (1765)
Zamagna, Rector (1766–?)
Antun Resti, Rector (1767)
Sabo Giorgi, Rector (1768)
Saro Sorgo, Rector (1769)
Marin Boža Sarace, Đivo Rafa Gozze, Rector (1770)
Niko Proculo, Rector (1773)
Lukša Giorgi-Bona, Rector (1774)
Martolica Bosdari, Rector (1775)
Luko Zamagna, Rector (1776)
Baldo Gozze, Rector (1777)
Miho Lukše Bone, Klement Vlaha Menze, Rector (1796)
Marin Giorgi, Rector (1797)
Đivo Basilio, Klement Menze, Antun Marina Caboge, Mato Zamagna, Rector (1798)
Rafo Gozze, Marin Bona, Rector (1800)

Greece

Septinsular Republic –
, Prince (1800–1803)

Montenegro

Prince-Bishopric of Montenegro (complete list) –
Danilo I, Prince-bishop (1696–1735)
Sava II, Prince-bishop (1735–1782)
Vasilije III, Prince-bishop (1750–1766)
Šćepan Mali, Prince-bishop (1768–1773)
Petar I, Prince-bishop (1782–1830)

British Isles

Great Britain and Ireland

Kingdom of England, Kingdom of Scotland, Kingdom of Ireland (complete list, complete list) –
William III & II, King (1689–1702)
Anne, Queen (1702–1714)
Kingdom of Great Britain, Kingdom of Ireland
Monarchs (complete list) –
Anne, Queen (1702–1714)
George I, King (1714–1727)
George II, King (1727–1760)
George III, King (1760–1820)
Prime ministers (complete list) –
Robert Walpole, Prime minister (1721–1742)
Spencer Compton, Prime minister (1742–1743)
Henry Pelham, Prime minister (1743–1754)
Thomas Pelham-Holles, Prime minister (1754–1756)
William Cavendish, Prime minister (1756–1757)
Thomas Pelham-Holles, Prime minister (1757–1762)
John Stuart, Prime minister (1762–1763)
George Grenville, Prime minister (1763–1765)
Charles Watson-Wentworth, Prime minister (1765–1766)
William Pitt the Elder, Prime minister (1766–1768)
Augustus FitzRoy, Prime minister (1768–1770)
Frederick North, Prime minister (1770–1782)
Charles Watson-Wentworth, Prime minister (1782)
William Petty, Prime minister (1782–1783)
William Cavendish-Bentinck, Prime minister (1783)
William Pitt the Younger, Prime minister (1783–1801)

Central

Holy Roman Empire, Kingdom of Germany
Emperors Elect, Kings –
Leopold I, Emperor Elect, King (1658–1705)
Joseph I, Emperor Elect (1705–1711), King (1690–1711)
Charles VI, Emperor Elect, King (1711–1740)
Charles VII, Emperor Elect, King (1742–1745)
Francis I, Emperor Elect (1745–1765), King (1745–1764)
Joseph II, Emperor Elect (1765–1790), King (1764–1790)
Leopold II, Emperor Elect, King (1790–1792)
Francis II, Emperor Elect, King (1792–1806)
Reichsvizekanzler: Vice Chancellor –
Dominik Andreas I. von Kaunitz, Vice Chancellor (1698–1705)
Friedrich Karl von Schönborn-Buchheim, Vice Chancellor (1705–1734)
Johann Adolf Graf von Metsch, Vice Chancellor (1734–1740)
Johann Georg Graf von Königsfeld, Vice Chancellor (1742–1745)
Rudolph Joseph von Colloredo, Vice Chancellor (1745–1788)
Franz de Paula Gundaker von Colloredo, Vice Chancellor (1789–1806)

Austria

Habsburg monarchy (complete list) –
Habsburg monarchs ruled under numerous simultaneous titles
Leopold I, (1657–1705)
Joseph I, (1705–1711)
Charles VI, (1711–1740)
Maria Theresa, (1740–1780)
Habsburg-Lorraine monarchs ruled under numerous simultaneous titles
Joseph II, (1780–1790)
Leopold II, (1790–1792)
Francis II, (1792–1835)

Bohemia

Kingdom of Bohemia (complete list) –
Leopold I, King (1656–1705)
Joseph I, King (1705–1711)
Charles III, King (1711–1740)
Maria Theresa, Queen (1740–1780)
Charles VII, anti-King (1741–1743)
Joseph II, King (1780–1790)
Leopold II, King (1790–1792)
Francis, King (1792–1835)

Hungary

Kingdom of Hungary (1526–1867) (complete list) –
Leopold I, King (1655–1705)
Joseph I, King (1687–1711)
Charles III, King (1711–1740)
Maria Theresa, Queen (1740–1780)
Joseph II, King (1780–1790)
Leopold II, King (1790–1792)
Francis, King (1792–1835)

Poland

Polish–Lithuanian Commonwealth: Kingdom of Poland (complete list) –
Augustus II the Strong, King and Grand Duke (1697–1706, 1709–1733)
Stanisław I, King and Grand Duke (1704–1709, 1733–1736)
August III the Saxon, King and Grand Duke (1733–1763)
Stanisław II August, King and Grand Duke (1764–1795)
Duchy/ Kingdom of Prussia, Electorate of Brandenburg (complete list, complete list) –
Frederick I, Duke (1688–1701), and King of Prussia (1701–1713), Elector of Brandenburg (1688–1713)
Frederick William I, King, Elector (1713–1740)
Frederick II the Great, King, Elector (1740–1786)
Frederick William II, King, Elector (1786–1797)
Frederick William III, King (1797–1840), Elector (1797–1806)

East

Crimean Khanate (complete list) –
Devlet II Giray, Khan (1699–1702)
Selim I Giray, Khan (1702–1704)
Ğazı III Giray, Khan (1704–1707)
Qaplan I Giray, Khan (1707–1708)
Devlet II Giray, Khan (1709–1713)
Qaplan I Giray, Khan (1713–1715)
Devlet III Giray, Khan (1716–1717)
Saadet IV Giray, Khan (1717–1724)
Meñli II Giray, Khan (1724–1730)
Qaplan I Giray, Khan (1730–1736)
Fetih II Giray, Khan (1736–1737)
Meñli II Giray, Khan (1737–1740)
Selamet II Giray, Khan (1740–1743)
Selim II Giray, Khan (1743–1748)
Arslan Giray, Khan (1748–1756)
Halim Giray, Khan (1756–1758)
Qırım Giray, Khan (1758–1764)
Selim III Giray, Khan (1765–1767)
Arslan Giray, Khan (1767)
Maqsud Giray, Khan (1767–1768)
Qırım Giray, Khan (1768–1769)
Devlet IV Giray, Khan (1769–1770)
Qaplan II Giray, Khan (1770)
Selim III Giray, Khan (1770–1771)
Sahib II Giray, Khan (1771–1775)
Devlet IV Giray, Khan (1775–1777)
Şahin Giray, Khan (1777–1782)
Bahadır II Giray, Khan (1782)
Şahin Giray, Khan (1782–1783)
Polish–Lithuanian Commonwealth: Grand Duchy of Lithuania (complete list) –
Augustus II the Strong, King and Grand Duke (1697–1706, 1709–1733)
Stanisław I, King and Grand Duke (1704–1709, 1733–1736)
August III the Saxon, King and Grand Duke (1733–1763)
Stanisław II August, King and Grand Duke (1764–1795)
Moldavia (complete list) –
Constantin Duca, Voivode (1693–1695, 1700–1703)
Ioan Buhuș, Chancellor (1703, 1709–1710)
Mihail III Racoviță, Prince (1703–1705, 1707–1709, 1715–1726)
Antioh Cantemir, Prince (1695–1700, 1705–1707)
Dimitrie Cantemir, Voivode (1693, 1710–1711)
Nicolae Mavrocordat, Prince (1709–1710, 1711–1715)
Lupu Costachi, Kaymakam (1711)
Ioan Ι Mavrocordat, Prince (1711)
Grigore II Ghica, Prince (1726–1733, 1735–1739, 1739–1741, 1747–1748)
Constantin Mavrocordat, Prince (1733–1735, 1741–1743, 1748–1749, 1769)
Russian occupation (1739)
Ioan II Mavrocordat, Prince (1743–1747)
Iordache Stavrachi, Prince (1749)
Constantin Racoviță, Prince (1749–1753, 1756–1757)
Matei Ghica, Prince (1753–1756)
Scarlat Ghica, Prince (1757–1758)
Ioan Teodor Callimachi, Prince (1758–1761)
Grigore Callimachi, Prince (1761–1764, 1767–1769)
Grigore III Ghica, Prince (1764–1767, 1774–1777)
Russian occupation (1769–1774)
Constantin Moruzi, Prince (1777–1782)
Alexander Mavrocordatos Delibey, Prince (1782–1785)
Alexander Mavrocordatos Firaris, Prince (1785–1786)
Alexander Ypsilantis, Prince (1786–1788)
Prince Josias of Saxe-Coburg, military commander of Austrian occupation (1787–1791)
Emanuel Giani Ruset, Prince (1788–1789)
Russian occupation (1788–1791)
Alexandru Moruzi, Prince (1792, 1802, 1806–1807)
Mihai Suțu, Prince (1793–1795)
Alexandru Callimachi, Prince (1795–1799)
Constantin Ipsilanti, Prince (1799–1801)
Tsardom of Russia (complete list) –
Peter I, Tsar (1682–1721), Emperor (1721–1725)
Russian Empire (complete list) –
Peter I, Tsar (1682–1721), Emperor (1721–1725)
Catherine I, Empress (1725–1727)
Peter II, Emperor (1727–1730)
Anna, Empress (1730–1740)
Ivan VI, Emperor (1740–1741)
Elizabeth, Empress (1741–1762)
Peter III, Emperor (1762)
Catherine II, Empress (1762–1796)
Paul, Emperor (1796–1801)
Principality of Transylvania (1570–1711) (complete list) –
Michael II Apafi, Prince (1690–1696/1701)
Francis II Rákóczi, Prince (1704–1711)
Principality of Wallachia (complete list) –
Constantin II Brâncoveanu, Prince (1688–1714)
Ștefan II Cantacuzino, Prince (1714–1715)
Phanariote rule (1715–1821)
Nicolae Mavrocordat, Prince (1715–1716, 1719–1730)
Habsburg occupation (1716)
Ioan Mavrocordat, Prince (1716–1719)
Constantin Mavrocordat, Prince (1730, 1731–1733, 1735–1741, 1744–1748, 1756–1758, 761–1763)
Mihai Racoviță, Prince (1730–1731, 1741–1744)
Grigore II Ghica, Prince (1733–1735, 1748–1752)
Matei Ghica, Prince (1752–1753)
Constantin Racoviță, Prince (1753–1756, 1763–1764)
Scarlat Ghica, Prince (1758–1761, 1765–1766)
Ștefan Racoviță, Prince (1764–1765)
Alexandru I Ghica, Prince (1766–1768)
Russian occupation (1768)
Grigore III Ghica, Prince (1768–1769)
Russian occupation (1769–1770)
Emanuel Giani Ruset, Prince (1770–1771)
Alexander Ypsilantis, Prince (1774–1782, 1796–1797)
Nicolae Caragea, Prince (1782–1783)
Mihai Suțu, Prince (1783–1786, 1791–1793, 1801–1802)
Nicolae Mavrogheni, Prince (1786–1789)
Prince Josias of Saxe-Coburg, military commander (1789–1790)
Alexandru Moruzi, Prince (1793–1796, 1799–1801)
Constantin Hangerli, Prince (1797–1799)

Ukraine

Kingdom of Galicia and Lodomeria (complete list) –
1772–1795, crownland of the Habsburg monarchy
Maria Theresa, Queen (1772–1780)
Joseph II, King (1780–1790)
Leopold II, King (1790–1792)
1795–1804, kingdom of the Habsburg monarchy
Leopold II, King (1790–1792)
Francis II, King (1792–1835)

Nordic

Denmark–Norway

Denmark–Norway (complete list, complete list) – 
Frederick IV, King (1699–1730)
Christian VI, King (1730–1746)
Frederick V, King (1746–1766)
Christian VII, King (1766–1808)
Duchy of Schleswig (complete list) –
Frederick IV, Duke of Holstein-Gottorp, Duke (1695–1702)
Frederick IV of Denmark, Duke (1699–1730)
Charles Frederick, Duke of Holstein-Gottorp, Duke (1702–1713)
Christian VI, Duke (1730–1746)
Frederick V, Duke (1746–1766)
Christian VII, Duke (1766–1808)

Sweden

Swedish Empire (complete list) –
Charles XII, King (1697–1718)
Sweden: Age of Liberty, Gustavian era (complete list) –
Ulrika Eleonora, Queen Regnant (1718–1720)
Frederick I, King (1720–1751)
Adolf Frederick, King (1751–1771)
Gustav III, King (1771–1792)
Gustav IV Adolf, King (1792–1809)

Southcentral

Italy: Holy Roman Empire

Cisalpine Republic (complete list) –
Sister Republic of the French First Republic, 1797–1802
For details see France under western Europe
Francesco Melzi d'Eril, Pietro Verri, Giuseppe Parini, Alessandro Volta, Directory (1797–1799)
Ligurian Republic –
Girolamo Luigi Durazzo, Doge (1797–1805)
(complete list) –
client republic of France, 1797–1805
For details see France under western Europe

Duchy of Mantua (complete list) –
Ferdinando Carlo, Duke (1665–1708)
Duchy of Massa and Principality of Carrara (complete list) –
Carlo II Cybo-Malaspina, Duke and Prince (1690–1710)
Alberico III Cybo-Malaspina, Duke and Prince (1710–1715)
Alderamo Cybo-Malaspina, Duke and Prince (1715–1731)
Maria Teresa Cybo-Malaspina, Duke and Prince (1731–1790)
Maria Beatrice, Duchess and Princess (1790–1796, 1815–1829)
Duchy of Montferrat (complete list) –
Ferdinand Charles, Duke (1665–1708)
Kingdom of Sardinia (complete list) –
Victor Amadeus II, King (1720–1730)
Charles Emmanuel III, King (1730–1773)
Victor Amadeus III, King (1773–1796)
Charles Emmanuel IV, King (1796–1802)
Papal States (complete list) –
Innocent XII, Pope (1691–1700)
Clement XI, Pope (1700–1721)
Innocent XIII, Pope (1721–1724)
Benedict XIII, Pope (1724–1730)
Clement XII, Pope (1730–1740)
Benedict XIV, Pope (1740–1758)
Clement XIII, Pope (1758–1769)
Clement XIV, Pope (1769–1774)
Pius VI, Pope (1775–1799)
Pius VII, Pope (1800–1823)
Duchy of Parma (complete list) –
Francesco, Duke (1694–1727)
Antonio, Duke (1727–1731)
Charles I, Duke (1731–1735)
Charles II, Duke (1735–1740)
Maria Theresa, Duke (1740–1748)
Philip, Duke (1748–1765)
Ferdinand, Duke (1765–1802)
San Marino
Captains Regent (1700–1900) –
Grand Duchy of Tuscany (complete list) –
Cosimo III, Grand Duke (1670–1723)
Gian Gastone, Grand Duke (1723–1737)
Francesco Stefano, Grand Duke (1737–1765)
Leopoldo I, Grand Duke (1765–1790)
Ferdinando III, Grand Duke (1790–1801, 1814–1824)
Republic of Venice (complete list) –
Alvise II Mocenigo, Doge (1700–1709)
Giovanni II Cornaro, Doge (1709–1722)
Sebastiano Mocenigo, Doge (1722–1732)
Carlo Ruzzini, Doge (1732–1735)
Alvise Pisani, Doge (1735–1741)
Pietro Grimani, Doge (1741–1752)
Francesco Loredan, Doge (1752–1762)
Marco Foscarini, Doge (1762–1763)
Alvise Giovanni Mocenigo, Doge (1763–1779)
Paolo Renier, Doge (1779–1789)
Ludovico Manin, Doge (1789–1797)

Italy: Southern

Kingdom of Naples (complete list) –
Philip IV, King (1700–1713)
Charles VI, King (1713–1734/35)
Charles VII, King (1734–1759)
Ferdinand IV, King (1759–1799)
Jean Étienne Championnet, Military Dictator (1799)
Jacques MacDonald, Military Dictator (1799)
Ferdinand IV, King (1799–1806)
Kingdom of Trinacria: Sicily (complete list) –
Philip V, King (1700–1713)
Victor Amadeus, King (1713–1720)
Charles IV, King (1720–1735)
Charles V, King (1735–1759)
Ferdinand IV, King of Sicily (1759–1816), of Naples (1815–1816), of the Two Sicilies (1816–1825)

Malta

Hospitaller Malta (complete list) –
Ramón Perellós, Grand Master (1697–1720)
Marc'Antonio Zondadari, Grand Master (1720–1722)
António Manoel de Vilhena, Grand Master (1722–1736)
Ramón Despuig, Grand Master (1736–1741)
Manuel Pinto da Fonseca, Grand Master (1741–1773)
Francisco Ximénez de Tejada, Grand Master (1773–1775)
Emmanuel de Rohan-Polduc, Grand Master (1775–1797)
Ferdinand von Hompesch, Grand Master (1797–1798)
Malta Protectorate (complete list) –
British protectorate, 1800–1813
For details see the United Kingdom under British Isles, Europe

Gozo –
Ferdinand, King (1798–1802)

Southwest

Andorra

Andorra
Episcopal Co-Princes (complete list) –
Julià Cano Thebar, Episcopal Co-Prince (1695–1714)
Simeó de Guinda i Apeztegui, Episcopal Co-Prince (1714–1737)
Jordi Curado i Torreblanca, Episcopal Co-Prince (1738–1747)
Sebastià de Victoria Emparán y Loyola, Episcopal Co-Prince (1747–1756)
Francesc Josep Catalán de Ocón, Episcopal Co-Prince (1757–1762)
Francesc Fernández de Xátiva y Contreras, Episcopal Co-Prince (1763–1771)
Joaquín de Santiyán y Valdivielso, Episcopal Co-Prince (1771–1779)
Juan de García y Montenegro, Episcopal Co-Prince (1780–1783)
Josep de Boltas, Episcopal Co-Prince (1785–1795)
Francesc Antoni de la Dueña y Cisneros, Episcopal Co-Prince (1797–1816)
French Co-Princes (complete list) –
Louis XIV, French Co-Prince (1643–1715)
Louis XV, French Co-Prince (1715–1774)
Louis XVI, French Co-Prince (1774–1792)

Portugal

Kingdom of Portugal (complete list) –
Peter II, King (1683–1706)
John V, King (1706–1750)
Joseph I, King (1750–1777)
Maria I, Queen (1777–1816)

Spain

Bourbon Spain
Monarchs (complete list) –
Charles of Austria, as Charles III, disputed King (1703–1715)
Philip V, King (1700–1724)
Louis I, King (1724)
Philip V, King (1724–1746)
Ferdinand VI, King (1746–1759)
Charles III, King (1759–1788)
Charles IV, King (1788–1808)

West

France

Kingdom of France: Ancien Régime (complete list) –
Louis XIV, King (1643–1715)
Louis XV, King (1715–1774)
Louis XVI, King (1774–1791 / 1791–1792)
Constitutional monarchy of France (complete list) –
Louis XVI, King (1774–1791 / 1791–1792)
French First Republic (complete list) –
Georges Danton, leading figure  (1792)
Jean-Marie Roland de la Platière, leading figure (1792–1793)
Étienne Clavière, leading figure (1793)
Georges Danton, leading figure (1793)
Maximilien Robespierre, leading figure (1793–1794)
Lazare Carnot, leading figure (1794)
Jean-Jacques-Régis de Cambacérès, leading figure (1794)
Lazare Carnot, leading figure (1794–1795)
Jean-Jacques-Régis de Cambacérès, leading figure (1795)
Lazare Carnot, Director of the French Directory (1795–1797)
Paul Barras, President of the Directory (1797–1799)
Emmanuel Joseph Sieyès, leading Member of the Directory (1799)
Napoleon Bonaparte, First Consul (1799–1804)

French

Anjou (complete list) –
Louis the Beloved, Duke (1710–1715)
Philip, Duke (1730–1733)
Louis the Desired, Duke (1755–1795)
Corsican Republic –
Pasquale Paoli, President (1755–1769)
Monaco (complete list) –
Louis I, Prince (1662–1701)
Antonio I, Prince (1701–1731)
Louise Hippolyte, Princess (1731)
Jacques I, Prince (1731–1733)
Honoré III, Prince (1733–1793)
Duchy of Nevers (complete list) –
Philippe Jules Mancini, Duke (1661–1707)
Philip Julius Francis Mancini, Duke (1707–1768)
Louis-Jules Mancini, Duke (1768–1798)

Low Countries

United Provinces: Dutch Republic
Stadtholders (complete list) –
William III, Stadtholder (1672–1702)
William IV, Stadtholder (1747–1751)
William V, Stadtholder (1751–1795)
Grand pensionaries (complete list) –
Anthonie Heinsius, Grand Pensionary (1689–1720)
Isaac van Hoornbeek, Grand Pensionary (1720–1727)
Simon van Slingelandt, Grand Pensionary (1727–1736)
Anthonie van der Heim, Grand Pensionary (1737–1746)
Willem Buys, Grand Pensionary (1746)
Jacob Gilles, Grand Pensionary (1747–1749)
Pieter Steyn, Grand Pensionary (1749–1772)
Pieter van Bleiswijk, Grand Pensionary (1772–1787)
Laurens Pieter van de Spiegel, Grand Pensionary (1787–1795)
Batavian Republic (complete list) –
Uitvoerend Bewind (1798–1801)
County of Artois (complete list) –
Philip V, Count (1700–1713)
Charles IV, Count (1713–1740)
Maria Theresa, Countess (1740–1780)
County of Drenthe (complete list) –
William III, Stadtholder (1696–1702)
Second Stadtholderless Period, Stadtholder (1702–1722)
William IV, Stadtholder (1722–1751)
William V, Stadtholder (1751–1795)
County of Flanders (complete list) –
Philip VII, Count (1700–1706)
Charles V, Count (1714–1740)
Maria Theresa, Countess (1740–1780)
Francis I, Count (1740–1765)
Joseph I, Count (1780–1790)
Leopold, Count (1790–1792)
Francis II, Count (1792–1835)
Lordship of Frisia (complete list) –
John William Friso, Stadtholder (1696–1711)
William IV, Stadtholder (1711–1747)
Lordship of Groningen (complete list) –
Henriette Amalia von Anhalt, Regent (1696–1707)
John William Friso, Stadtholder (1696–1711)
Marie Louise von Hessen-Kassel, regentess for William IV, Stadtholder (1711–1729)
William IV, Stadtholder (1711–1747)
Duchy of Guelders (complete list) –
William III, Stadtholder (1675–1702)
Second Stadtholderless Period, Stadtholder (1702–1722)
William IV, Stadtholder (1722–1747)
County of Holland, Lordship of Utrecht, County of Zeeland (complete list) –
William III, Stadtholder (1672–1702)
Second Stadtholderless Period, Stadtholder (1702–1747)
Lordship of Overijssel (complete list) –
William III, Stadtholder (1675–1702)
Second Stadtholderless Period, Stadtholder (1702–1747)
William IV, Stadtholder (1747–1751)
William V, Stadtholder (1751–1795)

Caucasus

Azerbaijan

Baku Khanate (complete list) –
Mirza Muhammad II, Khan (1797–1801)
Husayn Quli, Khan (1801–1806)
Ganja Khanate (complete list) –
Javad, Khan (1786–1804)
Nakhichevan Khanate (complete list) –
Kalbali, Khan (1787–1823)
Ehsan Kangarlu, Khan (1823–1828)
Karim Kangarlu, Khan (1828–1834)
Quba Khanate (complete list) –
Shaykh Ali Agha, Khan (1791–1806)
Husayn, Khan (1806–1816)

Georgia

Principality of Abkhazia (complete list) –
Rostom, Prince (c.1700–1730)
Manuchar, Prince (c.1730–1750)
Zurab, Prince (c.1750–1780)
Keilash Ahmed-Bey, Prince (c.1780–1808)
Kingdom of Imereti (complete list) –
Simon, King (1699–1701)
Mamia III, King (1701–1702, 1711, 1713)
George VI, King (1702–1707)
George VII, King (1707–1711, 1712–1713, 1713–1716, 1719–1720)
George IV, King (1716)
Alexander V, King (1720–1741, 1741–1746, 1749–1752)
George IX, King (1741)
Mamuka, King (1746–1749)
Solomon I, King (1752–1766, 1768–1784)
Teimuraz, King (1766–1768)
David II, King (1784–1789, 1790–1791)
Solomon II, King (1789–1790, 1792–1810)
Kingdom of Kakheti (complete list) –
direct Persian rule (1676–1703)
David II, King (1703–1722)
Constantine II, Ottoman vassal King (1722–1732)
Teimuraz II, Ottoman vassal King (1732–1735), Persian vassal King (1735–1744)
Heraclius II, King (1744–1762)
Kingdom of Kartli (complete list) –
Heraclius I, King (1688–1703)
George XI, King (1676–1688, 1703–1709)
Levan, King (1709)
Kaikhosro, King (1709–1711)
Jesse, King (1714–1716, 1724–1727)
Vakhtang VI, King (1716–1724)
Bakar, King (1716–1719)
Constantine II, King (1722–1732)
Ali Mirza, Viceroy (1735–c.1737)
Teimuraz II, King (1744–1762)
Kingdom of Kartli-Kakheti (complete list) –
Heraclius II, King (1762–1798)
George XII, King (1798–1800)
David Bagrationi, Regent (1800–1801)

Russia: Dagestan

Avar Khanate –
Umma, Khan (1774–1801)
Gazikumukh Khanate (complete list) –
Surkhay ibn Muhammad, Khan (1789–1820)
Aslan ibn Shakhmardan, Khan (1820–1836)
Nutsal-Aga ibn Aslan, Khan (1836–1836)
Muhammad-Mirza ibn Aslan, Khan (1836–1838)
Ummu Kulsum-Beke, Khan (1838–1841)
Abdurrahman ibn Umar, Khan (1841–1847)
Aglar ibn Umar, Khan (1847–1859)
Jafar ibn Aglar, Khan (1877–1877)

Oceania

Australia

Australia

Colony of New South Wales (complete list) –
British colony, 1788–1900
For details see the United Kingdom under British Isles, Europe

Pacific

Chile

Easter Island (complete list) –
Te Ravarava (Terava Rara), King (?)
Tehitehuke, King (?)
Te Rahai or Terahai, King (?)
Te Huke, King (?)
Tuu, from Mata Nui (Ko Tuu?), King (c.1770)
Hotu Iti, King (c.1773)
Honga, King (?)
Te Kena, King (?)

French Polynesia

Alo (complete list) –
Mala'evaoa, King
Nimo o le Tano'a, King
Veliteki, King (1748–1756)
unspecified, King (1756–1784)
Fonati, King (1784–c.1839)
Kingdom of Bora Bora (complete list) –
Teri'imaevarua I, Ari'i Rahi (?–1778)
Tapoa I, King (1772–1812)
Kingdom of Huahine (complete list) –
Tehaapapa I, de facto paramount ruler (f) (1760–1790)
Teriitaria I, King (1790–1793)
Tenania, King (1793–1810)
Sigave (complete list) –
Tuikamea, King (1784–?)
Inosiopogoi, King (late 18th century)
Latuka, King (?–1800)
Vanae, King (1800–1839)
Kingdom of Tahiti –
Pōmare I, King (1791–1803)
Uvea (complete list) –
Manuka, King (1767–1810)

New Zealand: Niue

Monarchy of Niue (complete list) –
Puni-mata, Patu-iki (c.1700–?)
Patua-valu, Patu-iki (?)

Tonga

Tuʻi Tonga Empire (complete list) –
Kafoamotalau, King (?)
Tuʻionukulave, King (?)
Silivakaifanga, King (?)
Fuatakifolaha, King (?)
Tupoulahi, King (?)
Maealiuaki, King (?)
Mumui, King (?)
Toafunaki, King (c.1790)
Mulikihaʻamea, King (?)
Tuʻi Tonga Empire (complete list) –
Mumui, Tuʻi Kanokupolu (?)
Tukuʻaho, Tuʻi Kanokupolu (1793–1799)
Maʻafu-ʻo-limuloa, Tuʻi Kanokupolu (1799)
Tupoumālohi, Tuʻi Kanokupolu (1799–1812)

United Kingdom: Pitcairn

Pitcairn Island (complete list) –
Fletcher Christian, Leader (1790–1793)
Ned Young, Leader (1793–1800)
John Adams, Leader (1800–1829)

United States: Hawaii

Kauai (complete list) –
Kualii, King (?–1730)
Peleioholani, King (1730–1770)
Kamakahelei, (female) King (1770–1794)
Kaumualiʻi, King of Kaua'i and Ni'ihau (1794–1810)
Island of Hawaiʻi (complete list) –
Keaweʻīkekahialiʻiokamoku, co-ruler with his half-sister wife Kalanikauleleiaiwi (1695–1725)
Alapaʻinui, supreme high chief (1725–1754)
Keaweʻōpala, supreme high chief (c.1754)
Kalaniʻōpuʻu, supreme high chief (1754–1782)
Kīwalaʻō, supreme high chief (1782)
Kamehameha I, supreme high chief (1782–1795)
Hawaiian Kingdom (complete list) –
Kamehameha I, King (1795–1819)

See also
List of governors of dependent territories in the 18th century
List of state leaders in the 18th-century Holy Roman Empire
List of state leaders in 18th-century British South Asia and its predecessor states

Notes

References

18th century
 
-